Maximilien François Marie Isidore de Robespierre (6 May 1758 – 28 July 1794) was a French lawyer and statesman who became one of the best-known, influential, and controversial figures of the French Revolution. As a member of the Estates-General, the Constituent Assembly, and the Jacobin Club, he campaigned for universal manhood suffrage,  the right to vote for people of color, Jews, actors, and domestic staff, and the abolition of both clerical celibacy and French involvement in the Atlantic slave trade. In 1791, Robespierre was elected as "public accuser" and became an outspoken advocate for male citizens without a political voice, for their unrestricted admission to the National Guard, to public offices, and to the commissioned ranks of the army, for the right to petition and the right to bear arms in self defence. Robespierre played an important part in the agitation which brought about the fall of the French monarchy on 10 August 1792 and the convocation of the National Convention. His goal was to create a one and indivisible France, establish equality before the law, abolish prerogatives, and defend the principles of direct democracy. He earned the nickname "the incorruptible" for his adherence to strict moral values.

As one of the leading members of the Paris Commune, Robespierre was elected as a deputy to the French Convention in early September 1792 but was soon criticised for trying to establish either a triumvirate or a dictatorship. In April 1793, Robespierre urged the Jacobins to raise a sans-culotte army to enforce revolutionary laws and sweep away any counter-revolutionary conspirator, leading to the armed Insurrection of 31 May – 2 June 1793. Because of his health, Robespierre announced he was to resign but on 27 July he was appointed as a member of the powerful Committee of Public Safety. This allowed him to successfully promote a reorganization of the Revolutionary Tribunal, a war cabinet, and worship of a Supreme Being. Those who were not actively defending France (modérantisme) became his enemy.  During the Reign of Terror, at least 300,000 suspects were arrested; 17,000 were officially executed, and perhaps 10,000 died in prison or without trial.

Although Robespierre always had like-minded allies, the politically motivated violence that the Montagne faction often promoted disillusioned others. Both members of the Convention and the French public eventually turned against him. According to Jeremy Popkin, he was undone by his obsession with the vision of an ideal republic. In the middle of the night he and his allies were arrested in the Paris town hall on 9 Thermidor. Robespierre was wounded in his jaw, but it is not known if it was self-inflicted or the outcome of the skirmish. About 90 people, including Robespierre, were executed in the days after, events that initiated a period known as the Thermidorian Reaction, and the left wing in the convention was decimated.

A divisive figure during his lifetime due to his views and policies, Robespierre remains controversial to this day. According to Marcel Gauchet, no one divides France more than Robespierre. His legacy and reputation continue to be subject to academic and popular debate. To some, Robespierre was the Revolution's principal ideologist and embodied the country's first democratic experience, marked by the often-revised and never-implemented French Constitution of 1793. To others, he was the incarnation of the Terror itself.

Early life 
Maximilien de Robespierre was baptized on 6 May 1758 in Arras in the old French province of Artois. His family has been traced back to the 15th century in Vaudricourt, Pas-de-Calais. His paternal grandfather, also named Maximilien de Robespierre, established himself in Arras as a lawyer. His father, François Maximilien Barthélémy de Robespierre (1732–1777), was a lawyer at the  who married Jacqueline Marguerite Carrault (1735–1764), the daughter of a brewer, on 3 January 1758. Maximilien was born five months later as the eldest of four children. His siblings were Charlotte (1760–1834), Henriette (1761–1780), and Augustin (1763–1794).

In July 1764, Robespierre's mother, having given birth to a stillborn daughter, died twelve days later at the age of 29. Devastated by his wife's death, François de Robespierre left Arras around 1767. His two daughters were brought up by their paternal aunts, and his two sons were taken in by their maternal grandparents. Robespierre was only six years old at the time of his mother's death. Already literate at age eight, Maximilien started attending the collège of Arras (middle school). In October 1769, on the recommendation of the bishop :fr:Louis-Hilaire de Conzié, he received a scholarship at the Collège Louis-le-Grand in Paris. His fellow pupils included Camille Desmoulins and Stanislas Fréron. In school, he learned to admire the idealised Roman Republic and the rhetoric of Cicero, Cato and Lucius Junius Brutus. In 1776 he was awarded first prize for rhetoric. He also studied the works of the Genevan philosophe Jean-Jacques Rousseau and was attracted to many of the ideas in his Contrat Social. Robespierre became intrigued by the idea of a "virtuous self", a man who stands alone accompanied only by his conscience. His study of the classics prompted him to aspire to Roman virtues, but he sought to emulate Rousseau's citizen-soldier in particular. Robespierre's conception of revolutionary virtue and his programme for constructing political sovereignty out of direct democracy came from Montesquieu, Rousseau, and Mably. With Rousseau, Robespierre considered the "volonté générale" or the general will of the people as the basis of political legitimacy.

Early politics 

Robespierre studied law for three years at the Sorbonne. Upon his graduation on 31 July 1780, he received a special prize of 600  for exemplary academic success and personal good conduct. On 15 May 1781, Robespierre gained admission to the bar. The bishop of Arras, Hilaire de Conzié, appointed him as one of the five judges in the criminal court in March 1782.  Robespierre soon resigned, owing to discomfort in ruling on capital cases arising from his early opposition to the death penalty. His most famous case took place in May 1783 and involved a lightning rod in St. Omer. His defence was printed and he sent Benjamin Franklin a copy.

On 15 November 1783, he was elected a member of the literary Academy of Arras. In 1784 the Academy of Metz awarded him a medal for his essay on the question of whether the relatives of a condemned criminal should share his disgrace, which made him a man of letters. He and Pierre Louis de Lacretelle, an advocate and journalist in Paris, divided the prize.  Robespierre attacked inequality before the law: the indignity of illegitimate or natural children (1786), three years later the lettres de cachet (imprisonment without a trial) and the sidelining of women in academic life. (Robespierre had particularly Louise-Félicité de Kéralio in mind). He became acquainted with the lawyer Martial Herman, the young officer and engineer Lazare Carnot and the teacher Joseph Fouché, all of whom would play a role in his later life. Some claim Robespierre had seen Rousseau shortly before he died, but others maintain that the account was apocryphal.

In August 1788, King Louis XVI announced new elections for all provinces and a gathering of the Estates-General for 1 May 1789 to solve France's serious financial and taxation problems. Robespierre participated in a discussion regarding how the French provincial government should be elected, arguing in his Address to the Nation of Artois that if the former mode of election by the members of the provincial estates was again adopted, the new Estates-General would not represent the people of France. In late February 1789, France saw a pressing crisis due to its desire for a new constitution, according to Gouverneur Morris.

In his electoral district, Robespierre began to make his mark in politics with his Notice to the Residents of the Countryside of 1789 in which he attacked the local authorities. With this, he secured the support of the country electors. On 26 April 1789, Robespierre was elected as one of 16 deputies for Pas-de-Calais to the Estates-General; others were Charles de Lameth and Albert de Beaumetz. When the deputies arrived at Versailles they were presented to the king and listened to Jacques Necker's three-hour-long speech about  institutional and political reforms. They were informed that all voting in the Estates General of 1789 would still be "by order" not "by head", so their double representation as promised on 27 November 1788 was to be meaningless. It resulted in Abbé Sieyès opposing the veto of the King, suggesting that the Third Estate meet separately and change its name. On 6 June Robespierre made his first speech of note, attacking the church hierarchy. On 13 June, Robespierre joined the deputies, who would call themselves the National Assembly representing 96% of the nation. On 9 July, the Assembly moved to Paris. It transformed itself into the National Constituent Assembly to discuss a new constitution and taxation system.

On 13 July, the National Assembly proposed to reestablish the "bourgeois militia" in Paris to control the riots. On 14 July, the people demanded arms and stormed the Hôtel des Invalides and the Bastille. Without going into detail the town militia changed into National Guard, keeping the very poorest citizens at arm's length. Marquis de La Fayette was acclaimed their commander-in-chief. On 20 July, the Assembly decided to establish National Guards in every commune in the country. The Gardes Françaises were admitted and supported to elect "new ". Discussing the matter and attacking Lally-Tollendal who called for law and order Robespierre reminded to the citizens who had defended liberty a few days before, but were not allowed to have access to it. 

In October he and Louvet supported Maillard after the Women's March on Versailles. The original group of nascent all-female protesters had a relatively conciliatory message, and they were augmented by more militarized and experienced male groups by the time they reached Versailles. While the Constituent Assembly occupied itself with male census suffrage, Robespierre and a few more deputies opposed the property requirements for voting and holding office. In December and January Robespierre succeeded in attracting the attention of the excluded classes, particularly Protestants in France, Jews, blacks, servants and actors.

As a frequent speaker in the Assembly, Robespierre voiced many ideas in support of the Declaration of the Rights of Man and of the Citizen (1789) and constitutional provisions for the Constitution of 1791 but rarely attracted a majority among fellow deputies, according to Malcolm Crook. Robespierre, who never gave up wearing a culotte and always poudré, frisé, et parfumé (with hair powdered, curled and perfumed), seems to have been nervous, timid and suspicious. Madame de Staël described Robespierre as 'very exaggerated in his democratic principles'. He supported propositions with a coolness that had the air of conviction.

Jacobin Club 

From October 1789, Robespierre lived at 30 Rue de Saintonge in Le Marais, a district with relatively wealthy inhabitants. Pierre Villiers claimed he was his secretary for several months, and they shared the apartment on the third floor. Robespierre associated with the new Society of the Friends of the Constitution, commonly known as the Jacobin Club. Originally, this organization (the Club Breton) comprised only deputies from Brittany, but after the National Assembly had moved to Paris into a former and empty monastery, the Friends of civic participation admitted non-deputies, supporting the changes in France. Among these 1,200 men, Robespierre found a sympathetic audience. Equality before the law was the keystone of the Jacobin ideology. In January he held several speeches in response to the decision-making the exercise of civil rights dependent on a certain sum in the tax. During the debate on the suffrage, Robespierre ended his speech of 25 January 1790 with a blunt assertion that 'all Frenchmen must be admissible to all public positions without any other distinction than that of virtues and talents'. He began to acquire a reputation, and on 31 March 1790 Robespierre was elected as their president. On 28 April Robespierre proposed to allow an equal number of officers and soldiers in the court martial, based on his democratic principles. Unlike Niccolò Machiavelli who promoted the creation of either town or regional citizen militia, a system which after three centuries had become a "fossil institution", Robespierre supported the cooperation of all the National Guards in a general federation on 11 May. On 19 June he was elected secretary of the National Assembly.

On 24 March 1790, the Assembly decided that the judicial apparatus should be completely restructured.
The departments of France were reorganized; the Paris Commune was divided up into 48 sections and allowed to discuss the election of a new mayor on 21 May. In July Robespierre demanded "fraternal equality" in salaries. On 2 August Jean Sylvain Bailly became Paris' first elected mayor with 12.500 votes; Georges Danton had 49, Marat and Louis XVI only one. On 19 August Robespierre received his first letter from Saint-Just expressing his admiration. 
Discussing the future of Avignon Robespierre and his supporters on the galleries succeeded in silencing Mirabeau. Before the end of the year, he was seen as one of the leaders of the small body of the extreme left. Robespierre was one of "the thirty voices". Mirabeau commented to Barnave, "That man will go far—he believes everything he says." On 5 December Robespierre delivered a speech on the urgent topic of the National Guard. "To be armed for personal defence is the right of every man, to be armed to defend freedom and the existence of the common fatherland is the right of every citizen". Robespierre coined the famous motto  by adding the word fraternity on the flags of the National Guard. On 18 December it was decreed to supply the National Guard with 50,000 fusils.

1791 
Early 1791 freedom of defense became the standard; any citizen was allowed to defend another. From the beginning, the authorities were concerned about this experiment without future. Derasse suggests it was a "collective suicide" by the lawyers in the Assembly.  In criminal cases, the expansion of the right ... gave priority to the spoken word. In 1791 Robespierre gave 328 speeches, almost one a day. 

On 28 January Robespierre discussed in the Assembly the organisation of the National Guard; for three years a hot topic in French newspapers. Early March provincial militias were abolished and the Paris département was placed above the Commune in all matters of general order and security. According to Jan ten Brink it had the right to suspend the Commune's decisions and to dispose of the army against her in case of emergency. After the death of Count Mirabeau, the politicians competed with each other who would fill the gap as orator. On 27 and 28 April 1791, Robespierre opposed plans to reorganize the National Guard and restrict its membership to active citizens. It was regarded as too aristocratic. He demanded the reconstitution of the National Guard on a democratic basis.  He felt that the National Guard had to become the instrument of defending liberty and no longer be a threat to it.

On 9 May, the Assembly discussed the right to petition.  Article III specifically recognised the right of active citizens to meet together to draw up petitions and addresses and present them to municipal authorities. On Sunday 15 May the Constituent Assembly declared full and equal citizenship for all free people of color. In the debate Robespierre said: "I feel that I am here to defend the rights of men; I cannot consent to any amendment and I ask that the principle be adopted in its entirety." He descended from the rostrum in the middle of the repeated applause of the left and of all the tribunes. On 16–18 May when the elections began, Robespierre proposed and carried the motion that no deputy who sat in the Constituent assembly could sit in the succeeding Legislative assembly. The principal tactical purpose of this self-denying ordinance was to block the ambitions of the old leaders of the Jacobins, Antoine Barnave, Adrien Duport, and Alexandre de Lameth, aspiring to create a constitutional monarchy roughly similar to that of England. On 28 May, Robespierre proposed all Frenchmen should be declared active citizens and eligible to vote. On 30 May, he delivered a speech on the abolishment of the death penalty but without success. According to Hillary Mantel: It is perfectly constructed, a brilliant fusion of logic and emotion, as much a work of art as a building or a piece of music could be. The following day, Robespierre attacked Abbé Raynal, who sent an address criticising the work of the Assembly and demanding the restoration of the royal prerogative.

On 10 June, Robespierre delivered a speech on the deplorable state of the police and proposed to dismiss officers. The next day, Robespierre accepted the function of "public accuser" in the criminal tribunal preparing indictments and ensuring the defence. Two days later, L'Ami du Roi, a royalist pamphlet, described Robespierre as a "lawyer for bandits, rebels and murderers". On 14 June, the abolition of the guild system was sealed; the Le Chapelier Law prohibited any kind of workers' coalition or assembly. (It concerned in the first instance as much collective petitioning by the political clubs as trade associations.) Proclaiming free enterprise as the norm upset Jean-Paul Marat, but not the urban labourer nor Robespierre. On 15 June, Pétion became president of the "tribunal criminel provisoire", after Duport refused to work with Robespierre.

After Louis XVI's failed flight to Varennes, the Assembly decreed that the king be suspended from his duties on 25 June until further notice. Between 13 and 15 July, the Assembly debated the restoration of the king and his constitutional rights. Robespierre declared in the Jacobin Club on 13 July: The current French constitution is a republic with a monarch. It is therefore neither a monarchy nor a republic. She is both. Meanwhile Tout-Paris was irritated by a decree to prevent the gathering of 20,000 armed men outside the city walls to celebrate 14 July. The crowd on the Champ de Mars approved a petition calling for the king's trial. Alarmed at the progress of the Revolution, the moderate Jacobins in favour of a constitutional monarchy founded the club of the Feuillants on the next day, taking with them 264 deputies. In the evening, the King was restored in his functions. 

On Saturday 17 July, Bailly and Lafayette declared a ban on gathering followed by martial law. After the Champ de Mars massacre, the authorities ordered numerous arrests. Robespierre, who attended the Jacobin club, did not dare to go back to the Rue Saintonge where he lodged, and so asked Laurent Lecointre if he knew a patriot near the Tuileries who could put him up for the night. Lecointre suggested Duplay's house and took him there. Maurice Duplay, a cabinetmaker and ardent admirer, lived at 398 Rue Saint-Honoré near the Tuileries. After a few days, Robespierre decided to move in permanently, although he lived in the backyard and was constantly exposed to the sound of working. He was motivated by a desire to live closer to the Assembly and the Jacobin club.  In September 1792, his younger sister and brother joined him and lived in the front house, but Charlotte insisted on moving to 5 Rue St Florentin because of his increased prestige and her tensions with Madame Duplay. According to his friend, the surgeon Joseph Souberbielle, Joachim Vilate, and Duplay's daughter Élisabeth, Robespierre became engaged to Duplay's eldest daughter Éléonore, but his sister Charlotte vigorously denied this; also his brother Augustin refused to marry her.

On 3 September, the French Constitution of 1791 was accepted; ten days later by the King also. Former "advocates" lost their title, their distinctive form of dress, their status, and their professional orders and adapted their practices to the new political and legal situation. The Penal Code is dated 25 September. On 29 September, the day before the dissolution of the Assembly, Robespierre opposed Jean Le Chapelier, who wanted to proclaim an end to the revolution and restrict the freedom of the political clubs. Robespierre had been carefully preparing for this confrontation and it was the climax of his political career up to this point. Pétion and Robespierre were brought back in triumph to their homes. He spent seven weeks in his home province Artois. On 16 October, Robespierre held a speech in Arras; one week later in Béthune, a small town he wished to settle. He went to a meeting of the Society of Friends of the Constitution, which was held on Sundays. Robespierre noticed the inns in Pas de Calais were filled with émigrés, likely Dutch patriots in exile. On 28 November, he was back in the Jacobin club, where he met with a triumphant reception. Collot d'Herbois gave his chair to Robespierre, who presided that evening. On 11 December 1791 Robespierre was installed as "accusateur public".

Opposition to war with Austria 

At the time of the Declaration of Pillnitz (27 August 1791), Brissot headed the Legislative Assembly. The declaration was from Austria and Prussia, warning the people of France not to harm Louis XVI or these nations would "militarily intervene" in the politics of France. Threatened by the declaration, Brissot rallied the support of the Legislative Assembly. As Marat, Danton and Robespierre were not elected in the new legislature,  oppositional politics often took place outside the Assembly. On 18 December 1791, Robespierre gave a (second) speech at the Jacobin club against the declaration of war. Robespierre warned against the threat of dictatorship stemming from war, in the following terms:

On 25 December, Guadet, the chairman of the Assembly, suggested that 1792 should be the first year of universal liberty. stated on 29 December that a war would be a benefit to the nation and boost the economy. He urged that France should declare war against Austria (War of the First Coalition). Marat and Robespierre opposed him, arguing that victory would create a dictatorship, while defeat would restore the king to his former powers; neither end, he said, would serve the revolution.

This opposition from expected allies irritated the Girondins, and the war became a major point of contention between the factions. In his third speech on the war, Robespierre countered  in the Jacobin club, "A revolutionary war must be waged to free subjects and slaves from unjust tyranny, not for the traditional reasons of defending dynasties and expanding frontiers..." Indeed, argued Robespierre, such a war could only favour the forces of counter-revolution, since it would play into the hands of those who opposed the sovereignty of the people. The risks of Caesarism were clear, for, in wartime, the powers of the generals would grow at the expense of ordinary soldiers, and the power of the king and court at the expense of the Assembly. These dangers should not be overlooked, he reminded his listeners; "...in troubled periods of history, generals often became the arbiters of the fate of their countries."  Already, Robespierre knew that he had lost, as he failed to gather a majority. His speech was nevertheless published and sent to all clubs and Jacobin societies of France.

On 10 February 1792, he gave a speech on how to save the State and Liberty and did not use the word war. He began by assuring his audience that everything he intended to propose was strictly constitutional. He then went on to advocate specific measures to strengthen, not so much the national defences as the forces that could be relied on to defend the revolution. Not only the National Guard but also the people had to be armed, if necessary with pikes. Robespierre promoted a people's army, continuously under arms and able to impose its will on Feuillants and Girondins in the Constitutional Cabinet of Louis XVI and the Legislative Assembly. The Jacobins decided to study his speech before deciding whether it should be printed.

On 15 February 1792 the installation of the criminal court of the department of Paris, took place.  For Robespierre it was an ungrateful position as "public accuser"; it meant he was not allowed to the bar before the jury had spoken their verdict.  Not long after Robespierre was accused by Brissot and Guadet of trying to become the idol of the people. Meanwhile the French had to deal with serious inflation and  Étienne Clavière was appointed as minister of finance. On 26 March, Guadet accused Robespierre of superstition, relying on divine providence; being against the war he was also accused of acting as a secret agent for the Austrian Committee. On 29 March Robespierre demanded the creation of a non counter-revolutionary government. The Girondins planned strategies to out-manoeuvre Robespierre's influence among the Jacobins. On 10 April, Robespierre resigned the unenviable position of "public accuser". When in Spring 1792, under pressure from the Assembly, the king accepted several Girondin ministers into his cabinet, according to Louvet it was only due to a smear campaign by Robespierre and his followers that he was not also appointed. On 27 April, as part of his speech responding to the accusations by Brissot and Guadet against him, he threatened to leave the Jacobins, claiming he preferred to continue his mission as an ordinary citizen.

On 17 May, Robespierre published the first issue of his weekly periodical  (The Defender of the Constitution), in which he attacked Brissot and publicised his scepticism over the whole war movement. The periodical, printed by his neighbour Nicolas served multiple purposes: to print his speeches, to counter the influence of the royal court in public policy, and to defend him from the accusations of Girondist leaders; for Soboul its purpose was to give voice to the economic and democratic interests of the broader masses in Paris and defend their rights. Robespierre himself wrote a prospectus in which he explained to the subscribers his goals.

The insurrectionary Commune of Paris 

When the Legislative Assembly declared war against Austria on 20 April 1792, Robespierre stated that the French people must rise and arm themselves completely, whether to fight abroad or to keep a lookout for despotism at home.  Robespierre responded by working to reduce the political influence of the officer class and the king. On 23 April Robespierre demanded Marquis de Lafayette, the head of the Army of the Centre, to step down. While arguing for the welfare of common soldiers, Robespierre urged new promotions to mitigate the domination of the officer class by the aristocratic and royalist École Militaire and the conservative National Guard.  Along with other Jacobins, he urged in the fifth issue of his magazine the creation of an "armée révolutionnaire" in Paris, consisting of at least 20 or 23,000 men, to defend the city, "liberty" (the revolution), maintain order in the sections and educate the members in democratic principles; an idea he borrowed from Jean-Jacques Rousseau. According to Jean Jaures, he considered this even more important than the right to strike.

François Chabot declared that he had 182 documents proving the existence of a plot to dissolve the Assembly, set for 27 May. On 29 May 1792, the Assembly dissolved the Constitutional Guard, suspecting it of royalist and counter-revolutionary sympathies. In early June 1792, Robespierre proposed an end to the monarchy and the subordination of the Assembly to the General will. Following the king's veto of the Assembly's efforts to suppress  on a proposal of Carnot and Servan  to raise a (permanent) militia of volunteers on 8 June,  the monarchy faced an abortive demonstration of 20 June. Sergent-Marceau and Panis, the administrators of police, were sent out by Pétion to urge the Sans-culottes to lay down their weapons, telling them it was illegal to present a petition in arms (to demand the king to apply the constitution, accept the decrees, and recall the ministers). Their march to the Tuileries was not banned. They invited the officials to join the procession and march along with them.

Because French forces suffered disastrous defeats and a series of defections at the onset of the war, Robespierre and Marat feared the possibility of a military coup d'état. One was led by the Lafayette, head of the National Guard, who at the end of June advocated the suppression of the Jacobin Club. Robespierre publicly attacked him in scathing terms: 

On 2 July, the Assembly authorized the National Guard to go to the Festival of Federation on 14 July, thus circumventing a royal veto.  On 11 July, the Jacobins won an emergency vote in the wavering Assembly, declaring the nation in danger and drafting all Parisians with pikes into the National Guard. (Meanwhile, 20,000 Fédérés entered the city for the celebration of 14 July; Pétion was reinstalled.) On 15 July, Billaud-Varenne in the Jacobin club outlined the program for the next insurrection; the deportation of all the Bourbons, the cleansing of the National Guard, the election of a Convention, the "transfer of the Royal veto to the people", the deportation of all "enemies of the people" and exemption of the poorest from taxation. This sentiment reflected the perspective of more radical Jacobins including those of the Marseille Club, who wrote to the mayor and the people of Paris, "Here and at Toulon, we have debated the possibility of forming a column of 100,000 men to sweep away our enemies... Paris may have need help. Call on us!"

A few days later the news of the Brunswick Manifesto began sweeping through Paris. It was frequently described as unlawful and offensive to national sovereignty.

August 1792 
On 1 August the Assembly voted on Carnot's proposal and ordered the municipalities that pikes should be issued to all citizens, except vagabonds, etc. On 3 August the mayor and 47 sections demanded the deposition of the king. On 4 August the government planned to evade; during the night volunteers from Marseille led by Charles Barbaroux moved into the Cordeliers Convent. On 5 August Robespierre announced the uncovering of a plan for the king to escape to Château de Gaillon.  On 7 August Pétion suggested to Robespierre to contribute to the departure of Fédérés to appease the capital.  The Council of Ministers suggested arresting Danton, Marat and Robespierre if they visited the Jacobin club. On 9 August, when the Assembly refused to impeach LaFayette, the tocsin called the sections into arms. In the evening the "commissionaires" of several sections (Billaud-Varenne, Chaumette, Hébert, Hanriot, Fleuriot-Lescot, Pache, Bourdon) gathered in the town hall.  At midnight the municipal council of the city was dissolved. Sulpice Huguenin, head of the sans-culottes of the Faubourg Saint-Antoine, was appointed provisional president of the Insurrectionary Commune. 

Early in the morning on (Friday, 10 August) 30,000 Fédérés (volunteers from the countryside) and Sans-culottes (militants from the Paris sections) led a successful assault upon the Tuileries; according to Robespierre a triumph for the "passive" (non-voting) citizens. The frightened Assembly suspended the king and voted for the election of a National Convention to take its place. On the night of 11 August Robespierre was elected to the Paris Commune as one of the representatives for the "Section de Piques", the district where he lived. The governing committee called for the summoning of a convention chosen by universal male suffrage, to form a new government and reorganize France.  Camille Desmoulins thought that everything was over and that they could finally rest, but Robespierre overruled this by pointing out it could only be the beginning. On 13 August Robespierre declared himself against the strengthening of the départements. The next day Danton invited him to join the Council of Justice. Robespierre published the twelfth and last issue of "Le Défenseur de la Constitution", both an account and political testament.

On 16 August, Robespierre presented a petition to the Legislative Assembly from the Paris Commune to demand the establishment of a provisional Revolutionary Tribunal that had to deal with the "traitors" and "enemies of the people". The next day Robespierre was appointed as one of eight judges. When Robespierre refused to preside over it he was criticized. Robespierre himself preferred to represent the commune, and Fouquier-Tinville was appointed as president. The Paris commune decided to install the guillotine permanently.

The Prussian army crossed the French frontier on 19 August. The Paris armed sections were incorporated in 48 battalions of the National Guard under Santerre. The Assembly decreed that all the non-juring priests had to leave Paris within a week and the country within two weeks. On 27 August, in the presence of almost half the population of Paris, a funeral ceremony was held on Place du Carrousel for the victims who were killed during storming the Tuileries.

The passive citizens still strived for acceptance and the supply of weapons. Danton proposed that the Assembly should authorize house searches 'to distribute to the defenders of the "Patrie" the weapons that indolent or ill-disposed citizens may be hiding'. The section Sans-culottes organized itself as a surveillance committee, conducting searches and making arrests all over Paris.   On 28 August, the assembly ordered a curfew for the next two days. The city gates were closed; all communication with the country was stopped. At the behest of Justice Minister Danton, thirty commissioners from the sections were ordered to search in every (suspect) house for weapons, munition, swords, carriages, and horses. "They searched every drawer and every cupboard, sounded every panel, lifted every hearthstone, inquired into every correspondence in the capital.  As a result of this inquisition, more than 1,000 "suspects" were added to the immense body of political prisoners already confined in the jails and convents of the city". One of the prisoners was Beaumarchais, who spent under a week in prison for criticising the government. Marat and Robespierre both disliked Condorcet who proposed that the "enemies of the people" belonged to the whole nation and should be judged constitutionally in its name. A sharp conflict developed between the Legislative and the Commune and its sections. On 30 August the interim minister of Interior Roland and Guadet tried to suppress the influence of the Commune because the sections had exhausted the searches. The Assembly, tired of the pressures, declared the Commune illegal and suggested the organization of communal elections.

Robespierre was no longer willing to cooperate with Brissot, who promoted the Duke of Brunswick, and Roland, who proposed that the members of the government should leave Paris, taking the treasury and the king with it.  On Sunday morning 2 September the members of the Commune, gathering in the town hall to proceed the election of deputies to the National Convention, decided to maintain their seats and have Rolland and Brissot arrested. Madame de Staël who tried to escape Paris was forced by the crowd to go to the town hall. She noted that Robespierre was in the chair that day, assisted by Collot d'Herbois and Billaud-Varenne as secretaries.

The National Convention 

On 2 September 1792 French National Convention election began. At the same time, Paris was organizing its defence, but it was confronted with a lack of arms for the thousands of volunteers. Danton delivered a speech in the assembly and possibly referring to the (Swiss) inmates: "We ask that anyone who refuses to serve in person, or to surrender their weapons, is punished with death." Not long after the September Massacres began. Charlotte Corday held Marat responsible, Madame Roland Danton. Robespierre and Manuel, the public prosecutor, responsible for the police administration, visited the Temple prison to check on the security of the royal family. The next day on a proposal of Collot d'Herbois the Assembly decided to exclude royalist deputies from re-election to the Convention. Robespierre made sure Brissot (and his fellow Brissotins Pétion and Condorcet) could not be elected in Paris. According to Charlotte Robespierre, her brother stopped talking to his former friend, mayor Pétion de Villeneuve, ("Roi Pétion") accused of conspicuous consumption by Desmoulins, and finally rallied to Brissot. On 5 September, Robespierre was elected deputy to the National Convention but Danton and Collot d'Herbois received more votes than Robespierre. Madame Roland wrote to a friend: "We are under the knife of Robespierre and Marat, those who would agitate the people." The election were not the triumph for the Jacobins that they had anticipated, but during the course of the next nine months they gradually eliminated their opponents and seized control of the Convention.

On 21 September Pétion was elected as president of the convention; nearly all members were lawyers. The Jacobins and Cordeliers took the high benches at the back of the former Salle du Manège, giving them the label the Montagnards, or "the Mountaineers"; below them were the "Manège" of the Girondists, the moderate Republicans. The majority the Plain was formed by independents (as Barère, Cambon and Carnot) but dominated by the radical Mountain. On 25 and 26 September, Barbaroux and the Girondist Lasource accused Robespierre of wanting to form a dictatorship. Danton was asked to resign as minister as he was also a deputy. Rumours spread that Robespierre, Marat, and Danton were plotting to establish a triumvirate to save the First French Republic. (From October 1791 until September 1792 the French Legislative Assembly saw an unprecedented turnover of four ministers of Justice, four ministers of Navy, six ministers of the interior, seven ministers of foreign affairs, and eight ministers of war.) On 30 September Robespierre advocated for better laws; the registration of marriages, births, and burials was withdrawn from the church. On 29 October, Louvet de Couvrai attacked Robespierre. He accused him of star allures, of governing the Paris "Conseil Général" and have done nothing to stop the September massacre; instead, he had used it to have more Montagnards elected. Robespierre, who seems to have been sick was given a week to respond. On 5 November, Robespierre defended himself, the Jacobin Club, and his supporters in and beyond Paris:

Turning the accusations upon his accusers, Robespierre delivered one of the most famous lines of the French Revolution to the Assembly:

Louvet de Couvrai accused Robespierre of governing the Paris département,  paying the "septembriseurs" in order to gain more votes in the election. After publishing his speech "A Maximilien Robespierre et à ses royalistes (accusation)" Louvet was no longer admitted to the Jacobin Club. Condorcet considered the French Revolution as a religion and Robespierre had all the characteristics of a leader of a sect, or a cult. As his opponents knew well, Robespierre had a strong base of support among the women of Paris called tricoteuses (knitters). John Moore (Scottish physician) was sitting in the galleries, and noted that the audience was 'almost entirely filled with women'. The Girondins called on the local authorities to oppose the concentration and centralization of power.

Execution of Louis XVI 

The convention's unanimous declaration of a French Republic on 21 September 1792 left the fate of the former king open to debate. A commission was therefore established to examine the evidence against him while the convention's Legislation Committee considered legal aspects of any future trial. Most Montagnards favoured judgment and execution, while the Girondins were more divided concerning how to proceed, with some arguing for royal inviolability, others for clemency, and others advocating lesser punishment or banishment. On 13 November Robespierre stated in the Convention that a Constitution which Louis had violated himself, and which declared his inviolability, could not now be used in his defence. 

Robespierre had been taken ill and had done little other than support Saint-Just, a former colonel in the National Guard, who gave his first major speech to address and argue against the king's inviolability. On 20 November, opinion turned sharply against Louis following the discovery of a secret cache of 726 documents consisting of Louis's communications with bankers and ministers. At his trial, he claimed not to recognize documents signed by himself.

With the question of the king's fate now occupying public discourse, Robespierre delivered on 3 December a speech that would define the rhetoric and course of Louis's trial. All the deputies from the Mountain were asked to attend.  Robespierre argued that the dethroned king could now function only as a threat to liberty and national peace and that the members of the Assembly were not to be impartial judges but rather statesmen with responsibility for ensuring public safety:

In arguing for a judgment by the elected Convention without trial, Robespierre supported the recommendations of Jean-Baptiste Mailhe, who headed the commission reporting on legal aspects of Louis's trial or judgment. Unlike some Girondins (Pétion), Robespierre specifically opposed judgment by primary assemblies or a referendum, believing that this could cause a civil war. While he called for a trial of Queen Marie-Antoinette and the imprisonment of the Dauphin of France, Robespierre advocated that the king be executed despite his opposition to capital punishment:

On a proposal of Claude Bazire, a Dantonist, the National Convention decreed that Louis XVI be tried by its members. The next day on 4 December the Convention decreed all the royalist writings illegal. 26 December was the day of the last hearing of the King.  On 14 January 1793, the king was unanimously voted guilty of conspiracy and attacks upon public safety. Never before the convention was like a court. On 15 January the call for a referendum was defeated by 424 votes to 287, which Robespierre led. On 16 January, voting began to determine the king's sentence; the session continued for 24 hours. Robespierre worked fervently to ensure the king's execution. The Jacobins successfully defeated the Girondins' final appeal for clemency. On 20 January half of the deputies voted for immediate death. The next day Louis XVI was guillotined.

Destruction of the Girondins 

After the execution of the king, the influence of Robespierre, Danton, and the pragmatic politicians increased at the expense of the Girondins who were largely seen as responsible for the inadequate response to the Flanders Campaign they had themselves initiated with the War of the First Coalition. By mid-February Lazare Carnot proposed that annexation be undertaken on behalf of French interests whether or not the people to be annexed so wished. On 24 February the Convention decreed the first, but unsuccessful Levée en Masse as the attempt to draft new troops set off an uprising in rural France when the Montagnards lost influence in Marseille, Toulon and Lyon. At the end of February, more than a thousand shops were plundered in Paris. Protesters, defended by the Enragés, claimed that the Girondins were responsible for the rising and high prices.

March/April 1793 
Early March the War in the Vendée and the War of the Pyrenees began; the population of the Austrian Netherlands were in insurrection against the French invasion. The situation was alarming.  On 11 March, Dumouriez addressed the Brussels assembly, apologizing for the actions of the French commissioners and soldiers. On 12 March Dumouriez criticized the interference of officials of the War Ministry which employed many Jacobins. He attacked not only Pache, the former minister of war, but also Marat and Robespierre. Dumouriez had long been unable to agree with the course of the Convention. He was disenchanted with the radicalization of the revolution and its politics and put an end to the annexation efforts. 

On 22 March Dumouriez retreated to Brussels. The next day Dumouriez promised the Austrians they would leave Belgium by the end of March without permission of the convention. He urged the Duke of Chartres, still a teenager, to join his plan to negotiate peace, dissolve the convention, to restore the French Constitution of 1791, the restoration of a constitutional monarchy and to free Marie-Antoinette and her children. The Jacobin leaders were quite sure that France had come close to a military coup mounted by Dumouriez and supported by the Girondins. On 24 March, Francisco de Miranda, the only general from Latin America in French service, blamed Dumouriez for the defeat in the Battle of Neerwinden (1793). On 25 March Robespierre became one of the 25 members of the Committee of General Defence to coordinate the war effort.  He demanded that relatives of the king should leave France, but Marie-Antoinette should be judged. He spoke of vigorous measures to save the convention but left the committee within a few days. Marat began to promote a more radical approach, war on the Girondins. 

On 3 April Robespierre declared before the Convention that the whole war was a prepared game between Dumouriez and Brissot to overthrow the First French Republic.  On 5 April the Convention substantially expanded the power of the Tribunal révolutionnaire.  On 6 April the Committee of Public Safety was installed with deputies from the Plaine and the Dantonists but no Girondins or Robespierrists.  Robespierre who was not elected was pessimistic about the prospects of parliamentary action and told the Jacobins that it was necessary to raise an army of Sans-culottes to defend Paris and arrest infidel deputies, naming and accusing Brissot, Isnard, Vergniaud, Guadet and Gensonné. There are only two parties according to Robespierre: the people and its enemies.  On 10 April Robespierre accused Dumouriez in a speech: "He and his supporters have brought a fatal blow to the public fortune, preventing circulation of assignats in Belgium".

Robespierre's speeches during April 1793 reflect the growing radicalization. "I ask the sections to raise an army large enough to form the kernel of a Revolutionary Army that will draw all the sans-culottes from the departments to exterminate the rebels..." "Force the government to arm the people, who in vain demanded arms for two years." Suspecting further treason, Robespierre invited the convention to vote the death penalty against anyone who would propose negotiating with the enemy. Marat was imprisoned calling for a military tribunal as well as the suspension of the convention.  On 15 April the convention was stormed again by the people from the sections, demanding the removal of those Girondins who had defended the King. Till 17 April the convention discussed the Declaration of the Rights of the Man and of the Citizen of 1793, a political document that preceded that country's first republican constitution. On 18 April the Commune announced an insurrection against the convention after the arrest of Marat. On 19 April Robespierre opposed article 7 on equality before the law; on 22 April the convention discussed article 29 on the right of resistance. On 24 April Robespierre presented his version with four articles on the right of property. He was in effect questioning the individual right of ownership, and advocated a progressive tax and fraternity between the people of all the nations.

On 27 April the convention decreed (on the proposal of Danton) to send 20,000 additional forces to the departments in revolt.  According to François Mignet the commune was destined to triumph over the convention. Pétion called for the help of supporters of law and order.

May 

On 1 May, according to the Girondin deputé Dulaure 8,000 armed men prepared to go to the Vendée surrounded the convention and threatened not to leave if the emergency measures (a decent salary and maximum on food prices) demanded were not adopted. On 4 May the convention agreed to support the families of soldiers and sailors who left their home to fight the enemy. Robespierre pressed ahead with his strategy of class war. On 8 and 12 May in the Jacobin Club, Robespierre restated the necessity of founding a revolutionary army  to be funded by a tax on the rich and would be intended to defeat aristocrats and counter-revolutionaries inside both the convention and across France. He said that public squares should be used to produce arms and pikes. Mid May Marat and the Commune supported him publicly and secretly. After hearing these statements, the Girondins became concerned. On 18 May Guadet called for the closing of all the political institutions in Paris and to examine the "exactions" and to replace municipal authorities.
Within a few days, the Convention decided to set up a commission of inquiry of twelve members, with a very strong Girondin majority. On 24 May the Twelve proposed reinforcing the National Guard patrols round the convention. Jacques Hébert, the editor of Le Père Duchesne, was arrested after attacking or calling for the death of the 22 Girondins. The next day, the Commune demanded that Hébert be released. The president of the Convention Maximin Isnard, who had enough of the tyranny of the Commune, threatened with the destruction of Paris.

On 26 May, after a week of silence, Robespierre delivered one of the most decisive speeches of his career. He openly called at the Jacobin Club "to place themselves in insurrection against corrupt deputies". Isnard declared that the convention would not be influenced by any violence and that Paris had to respect the representatives from elsewhere in France. The Convention decided Robespierre would not be heard. (During the whole debate Robespierre sat on the gallery.) The atmosphere became extremely agitated. Some deputies were willing to kill if Isnard dared to declare civil war in Paris; the president was asked to give up his seat. On 28 May a weak Robespierre excused himself twice for his physical condition but attacked in particular Brissot of royalism. He referred to 25 July 1792 where their points of view split. Robespierre left the convention after applause from the left side and went to the town hall. There he called for an armed insurrection against the majority of the convention. "If the Commune does not unite closely with the people, it violates its most sacred duty", he said.  In the afternoon the Commune demanded the creation of a Revolutionary army of sansculottes in every town of France, including 20,000 men to defend Paris.  The 29 May was occupied in preparing the public mind.  Robespierre  admitted he almost gave up his career because of his anxieties since he became a deputy. The delegates representing 33 of the Paris sections formed an insurrectionary committee.  Henriot was elected as "Commandant-Général" of the Parisian National Guard. Saint-Just was added to the Committee of Public Safety; Couthon became secretary. The next day the tocsin in the Notre-Dame was rung and the city gates were closed; the Insurrection of 31 May – 2 June began. Hanriot, was ordered to fire a cannon on the Pont-Neuf as a sign of alarm. Danton rushed to the tribune: "Break up the Commission of Twelve! You have heard the thunder of the cannon. Robespierre urged the arrest of the Girondins. Around ten in the morning 12,000 armed citizens appeared to protect the Convention against the arrest of Girondin deputies. On Saturday 1 June the Commune gathered almost all day and devoted it to the preparation of a great movement. The "Comité insurrectionnel" ordered Hanriot to surround the Convention 'with a respectable armed force'. In the evening 40,000 men surrounded the building to force the arrest. Marat lead the attack on the representatives, who had voted against the execution of the King and since then paralyzed the Convention.  The Committee of Public Safety postponed decisions on the accused deputies for three days;  Marat demanded a decision within a day.

Unsatisfied with the result the commune demanded and prepared a "Supplement" to the revolution. Hanriot offered (or was ordered) to march the National Guard from the town hall to the National Palace. The next morning a large force of armed citizens, some estimated 80,000 or 100,000, but Danton spoke of only 30,000, surrounded the Convention with artillery. "The armed force", Hanriot said, "will retire only when the convention has delivered to the people the deputies denounced by the Commune." Two pieces were directed upon the convention, who, retiring to the gardens, sought an outlet at various points, but found all the issues guarded. Confronted on all sides by bayonets and pikes, the deputies returned to the meeting hall. The Girondins believed they were protected by the law, but the people in the galleries called for their arrest. Twenty-two Girondins were seized one by one after some juggling with names. They finally decided that 31 deputies were not to be imprisoned, but only subject to house arrest; scarcely half of the assembly taking part in the vote.

The Montagnards now had unchallenged control of the convention; according to Couthon the citizens of Paris had saved the country. The Girondins, going to the provinces, joined the counter-revolution. Within two weeks and for three months almost fifty departments were in rebellion.

During the insurrection Robespierre had scrawled a note in his memorandum-book:

On 3 June French the convention decided to split up the land belonging to Émigrés and sell it to farmers. On 12 June Robespierre wanted to resign lacking strength. On 13 July Robespierre defended the plans of Le Peletier to teach revolutionary ideas in boarding schools. On the following day the convention rushed to praise Marat – who was murdered in his bathtub – for his fervor and revolutionary diligence.  Robespierre simply called for an inquiry into the circumstances of his death. He did not pronounce his surname as they were never friends. On 17 or 22 July the Émigres were expropriated by decree; proofs of ownership had to be collected and burnt.

Reign of Terror 

The French government faced serious internal challenges, when the provincial cities  rebelled against the more radical revolutionaries in Paris.  Corsica declared formal secession from France and requested the protection of the British government; Pasquale Paoli forced the Bonapartes to move to the mainland. In July France threatened to plunge into civil war, attacked by the aristocracy in Vendée and Brittany, by federalist revolts in Lyon, in Le Midi, and in Normandy, in a struggle with all Europe and the foreign factions.

In early July, Danton was not re-elected as a member of the Committee of Public Safety. On 27 July 1793, Maximilien Robespierre joined the Committee, nearly two years after Danton had extended an invitation to him to do so.  It was the second time he held any executive office to coordinate the war effort.  Robespierre was criticized for being the most prominently known member of the Committee, but officially the Committee was non-hierarchical.

On 4 August the French Constitution of 1793 passed through the convention.  Article 109 stated: All Frenchmen are soldiers; all shall be exercised in the use of arms.
From the moment of its acceptance, it was made meaningless, first by the Convention itself, which had been charged to dissolve itself on completion of the document, then by the construction of the working institutions of the Terror. On 21 August Robespierre was elected as president of the convention. On 23 August Lazare Carnot was appointed in the committee; the provisional government introduced the Levée en masse against the enemies of the republic.  Couthon carried a law punishing any person who should sell assignats at less than their nominal value with imprisonment for twenty years in chains. Robespierre was particularly concerned that public officials should be virtuous. He had sent his brother Augustin (and sister Charlotte) to Marseille and Nice to suppress the federalist insurrection. At the end of August Toulon hoisted the royal flag and delivered the port to the British navy. Both the strategic importance of the naval base and the prestige of the Revolution demanded that the French recapture Toulon.

On 4 September, the Sans-culottes again invaded the convention. They demanded tougher measures against rising prices and the setting up of a system of terror to root out the counter-revolution, despite the amount of assignats in circulation doubled in the previous months. On 5 September the Convention decided on a proposal of Chaumette, supported by Billaud and Danton to form a revolutionary army of 6,000 men in Paris to sweep away conspirators, to execute revolutionary laws and to protect subsistence. The next day the ultra's Collot d'Herbois and Billaud-Varenne were elected in the Committee of Public Safety. The Committee of General Security which was tasked with rooting out crimes and preventing counter-revolution began to manage the country's National Gendarmerie and finance. It was decreed that all the foreigners in the country should be arrested. On 8 September, the banks and exchange offices were closed to prevent the exchange of forged assignats and the export of capital, making investments in foreign countries punishable with death. Augustin Robespierre and Antoine Christophe Saliceti appointed the young Napoleon as provisional artillery commander of the republican forces in Toulon and who established a battery called the "sans-culottes". On 11 September the power of the Comité de Salut Public was extended for one month.  Jacques Thuriot, a firm supporter of Danton, resigned on 20 September because of irreconcilable differences with Robespierre and became one of the bolder opponents of Maximilien Robespierre. The Revolutionary Tribunal was reorganized and divided into four sections, of which two were always active at the same time. On 29 September, the Committee introduced the maximum, particularly in the area which supplied Paris. According to Augustin Cochin (historian) the shops were empty within a week. On 1 October the Convention decided to exterminate the "brigands" in the Vendée before the end of the month.

On 3 October Robespierre was convinced the convention was divided up in two factions, friends of the people and conspirators. He defended 73 Girondins as useful, but more than 20 were sent on trial. He attacked Danton, who had refused to take a seat in the Comité, and believed a stable government was needed which could resist the orders of the Comité de Salut Public. On 8 October the Convention decided to arrest Brissot and the Girondins. Robespierre called for the dissolution of the convention; he believed they would be admired by posterity. Cambon replied that was not his intention; applause followed and the session was closed. After the Siege of Lyon Couthon entered the city, the centre of a revolt. On 10 October the Convention decreed to recognize the Committee of Public Safety as the supreme "Revolutionary Government", (which was consolidated on 4 December). The provisional government would be revolutionary until peace according to Saint-Just. Every eight days the Committee of Public Safety would report to the convention. Though the Constitution was overwhelmingly popular and its drafting and ratification buoyed popular support for the Montagnards, on 10 October the Convention set it aside indefinitely until a future peace. They would instead continue governing without a Constitution. The Committee became a War cabinet with unprecedented powers over the economy as well as the political life of the nation, but it had to get the approval of the convention for any legislation and could be changed any time. Danton who was dangerously ill for a few weeks, probably knowing that he could not get along with Robespierre, quit politics and set off to Arcis-sur-Aube with his 16-year-old wife, who pitied the Queen since her trial began.

On 12 October when Hébert accused Marie-Antoinette of incest with her son, Robespierre had dinner with some strong supporters (Barère, Louis de Saint-Just and Joachim Vilate). Discussing the matter, Robespierre broke his plate with his fork and called Hébert an "imbécile". According to Vilate, Robespierre then had already two or three bodyguards. One of them was his neighbor, the printer Nicolas. On 25 October the Revolutionary government was accused of doing nothing. Fouché and Collot d'Herbois halted the revolt of Lyon against the National Convention, Jean-Baptiste Carrier ordered the drownings at Nantes; Tallien succeeded in feeding the guillotine in Bordeaux; Barras and Fréron went to Marseille and Toulon. Saint-Just and Le Bas visited the Rhine Army to watch the generals and punish officers for the least sign of treasonous timidity, or lack of initiative. His landlord, Maurice Duplay, became a member of the "Tribunal Révolutionair". On 31 October Brissot and 21 Girondins were guillotined in 36/43 minutes by Charles-Henri Sanson.

On 8 November the director of the manufacture of assignats and Manon Roland were executed. The Convention suppressed on 13 November under penalties,  all commerce in the precious metals. On the morning of 14 November, François Chabot burst into Robespierre's room dragging him from bed with accusations of counter-revolution and a foreign conspiracy, waving a hundred thousand livres in assignat notes, claiming that a band of royalist plotters gave it to him to buy Fabre d'Eglantine's vote, along with others, to liquidate some stock in the French East India Company. Chabot was arrested three days later; Courtois urged Danton to return to Paris immediately. On 25 November, the remains of Comte de Mirabeau were removed from the Pantheon and replaced with those of Jean-Paul Marat. It was on the initiative of Robespierre when it became known that in his last months the count had secretly conspired with the court of Louis XVI. Under intense emotional pressure from Lyonnaise women,  Robespierre suggested that a secret commission be set up to examine the cases of the Lyon rebels, to see if injustices had been committed. This is the closest Robespierre came to adopting a public position against the use of terror. On 3 December Robespierre accused Danton in the Jacobin club of feigning an illness to emigrate to Switzerland. Danton, according to him, showed too often his vices and not his virtue. Robespierre was stopped in his attack. The gathering was closed after applause for Danton.

On 4 December, by the Law of Revolutionary Government, the independence of departmental and local authorities came to an end, when extensive powers of the Committee of Public Safety were codified. This law, submitted by Billaud, implemented within 24 hours, was a drastic decision against the independence of deputies and commissionaires on a mission; coordinated action among the sections became illegal. The Commune of Paris and the revolutionary committees in the sections had to obey the law, the two Committees, and the convention.

The "enemy within" 

On 5 December the journalist Camille Desmoulins launched a new journal, . He defended Danton and warned not to exaggerate the revolution. He  compared Robespierre with Julius Caesar  and argued that the Revolution should return to its original ideas en vogue around 10 August 1792. In the fourth issue Desmoulins took up the cause of the 200,000 defenceless civilians and that had been detained in prisons as suspects. A Committee of Grace had to be established. Desmoulins addressed Robespierre directly, writing, "My dear Robespierre... my old school friend... Remember the lessons of history and philosophy: love is stronger, more lasting than fear." On 8 December, Madame du Barry  was guillotined. On receiving notice that he was to appear on the next day before the Revolutionary Tribunal Étienne Clavière committed suicide. On 12 December Robespierre attacked the wealthy foreigner Cloots in the Jacobin club of being a Prussian spy. Thomas Paine lost his seat in the convention, was arrested, and locked up having been friendly with Brissot. (Robespierre denounced the "dechristianizers" as foreign enemies.) The Indulgents mounted an attack on the Committee of Public Safety, accusing them of being murderers. On 17 December Vincent and Ronsin were arrested. On 21 December Collot d'Herbois declared: "...if I had arrived two days later I would perhaps have been put under indictment myself." 

Desmoulins counselled Robespierre not to attempt to build the Republic on such a rare quality as virtue. On the next day, 25 December, thoroughly provoked by Desmoulins' insistent challenges, Robespierre produced his Report on the Principles of Revolutionary Government. Robespierre replied to the plea for an end to the Terror, justifying the collective dictatorship of the National Convention, administrative centralization, and the purging of local authorities. He said he had to avoid two cliffs: indulgence and severity. He could not consult the 18th-century political authors, because they had not foreseen such a course of events. He protested against the various factions [Hébertists and Dantonists] that threatened the government. Robespierre strongly believed that the Terror was still necessary; "the Government has to defend itself" [against conspirators] and "to the enemies of the people it owes only death". According to R.R. Palmer and Donald C. Hodges, this was the first important statement in modern times of a philosophy of dictatorship. Others see it as a natural consequence of political instability and conspiracy.

February/March 
In his Report on the Principles of Political Morality of 5 February 1794, Robespierre praised the revolutionary government and argued that terror and virtue were necessary:

If virtue is the spring of a popular government in times of peace, the spring of that government during a revolution is virtue combined with terror: virtue, without which terror is destructive; terror, without which virtue is impotent. Terror is only justice prompt, severe, and inflexible; it is then an emanation of virtue; it is less a distinct principle than a natural consequence of the general principle of democracy, applied to the most pressing wants of the country ... The government in a revolution is the despotism of liberty against tyranny.

On 8 February 1794, Jean-Baptiste Carrier was recalled from Nantes, after a member of the Committee of Public Safety wrote to Robespierre with information about the atrocities being carried out, although Carrier himself wasn't put on trial. From 13 February to 13 March 1794, Robespierre had withdrawn from active business on the Committee due to illness. On 19 February, Robespierre decided, therefore, to return to the Duplays.  Saint-Just was elected president of the convention for the next two weeks. 
Early March in a speech at the Cordeliers Club, Hébert attacked  Robespierre on the violation of human rights and Danton on being too soft. He managed to acquire a small army of secret agents, which reported to him. (There were queues and near-riots at the shops and in the markets; there were strikes and threatening public demonstrations.) Some of the Hébertistes and their friends were calling for a new insurrection. On the night of 13–14 March, Hébert and 18 of his followers were arrested as the agents of foreign powers. On 15 March, Robespierre reappeared in the convention. Subsequently, he joined Saint-Just in his attacks on Hébert. The leaders of the "armées révolutionnaires" were denounced by the Revolutionary Tribunal as accomplices of Hébert. Around twenty people, (Cloots and De Kock) were guillotined on the evening of 24 March; their death of was a sort of carnival, a pleasant spectacle according to Michelet's witnesses. On 25 March Condorcet was arrested as he was seen as an enemy of the Revolution; he committed suicide two days later.

On 29 March Danton met again with Robespierre privately; afterwards, Marat's sister urged him to take the offensive. On 30 March the two committees decided to arrest Danton and Desmoulins after Saint-Just became uncharacteristically angry. On 31 March Saint-Just publicly attacked both. In the convention, criticism was voiced against the arrests, which Robespierre silenced with "...whoever trembles at this moment is guilty." Legendre suggested that "before you listen to any report, you send for the prisoners, and hear them". Robespierre replied "It would be violating the laws of impartiality to grant to Danton what was refused to others, who had an equal right to make the same demand. This answer silenced at once all solicitations in his favour." From 21 March – 5 April Tallien was president of the convention, but could not prevent the final triumph of the accusers. No friend of the Dantonists dared speak up in case he too should be accused of putting friendship before virtue.

April 
On 2 April the trial began on charges of conspiracy with the Duke of Orléans and Dumouriez. Corruption and a financial scandal involving the French East India Company provided a "convenient pretext" for Danton's downfall. Hanriot had been informed not to arrest the president and the "public accuser" of Revolutionary Tribunal. The Dantonists were not serving the people. They had become false patriots, who had preferred personal and foreign interests to the welfare of the nation. "Danton had been a traitor from the beginning of the Revolution and the emergency law voted to stifle his resounding voice make this one of the blackest moments in the whole history of the Revolution."  Fouquier-Tinville asked the tribunal to order the defendants who "confused the hearing" and insulted "National Justice" to the guillotine. The defendants, of whom nine were députés of the convention, were removed from the room before the verdict was delivered. Desmoulins struggled to accept his fate and accused Robespierre, the Committee of General Security, and the Revolutionary Tribunal. He was dragged up the scaffold by force. On the last day of their trial Lucile Desmoulins was imprisoned. She was accused of organizing a revolt against the patriots and the tribunal to free her husband and Danton.  She admitted to having warned the prisoners of a course of events as in September 1792, and that it was her duty to revolt against it. Remarkably, Robespierre was not only his friend but also witnessed at their marriage in December 1790, together with Pétion and Brissot.

On 1 April Lazare Carnot proposed the provisional executive council of six ministers be suppressed and the ministries be replaced by twelve Committees reporting to the Committee of Public Safety. The proposal was unanimously adopted by the National Convention and set up by Martial Herman on 8 April.  Carnot becoming more powerful argued with both Robespierre and St Just. When Barras and Fréron paid a visit to Robespierre, they were received in an extremely unfriendly manner. (Robespierre was without the spectacles he usually wore in public.) At the request of Robespierre, the Convention orders the transfer of the ashes of Jean-Jacques Rousseau to the Panthéon. 

Mid  April, it was decreed to centralize the investigation of court records and to bring all the political suspects in France to the Revolutionary Tribunal to Paris. A special police bureau inside the Comité de salut public was created, whose task was to monitor public servants. Foreigners were no longer allowed to travel through France or visit a Jacobin club; Dutch patriots who had fled to France before 1790 were excluded. On 22 April Malesherbes, a lawyer who had defended the king and the deputés Isaac René Guy le Chapelier and Jacques Guillaume Thouret, four times elected president of the Constituent Assembly were taken to the scaffold.  Saint-Just  and LeBas left Paris at the end of the month for the army in the north.   The police bureau,  directed by Martial Herman, became a serious rival of the Comité de sûreté after a month. Payan, even advised to Robespierre to get rid of the Committee of General Security, which, he said, broke the unity of action of the government.

June 
As the assignat was losing more and more value, the Convention decreed, that the death penalty should be inflicted on any person convicted of "having asked, before a bargain was concluded, in what money payment was to be made". On 5 June François Hanriot ordered the detention of every baker in Paris who sold his bread to people without (distribution) card or from another section. On 10 June Georges Couthon introduced the Law of 22 Prairial. The law would free the Revolutionary Tribunals from control by the Convention and would greatly strengthen the position of public accusers  by limiting the ability of suspects to defend themselves. Furthermore, the law broadened the sorts of charges that could be brought so that virtually any criticism of the government became criminal. The legal defence was sacrificed in favor of efficiency and centralization by banning any assistance for defendants brought before the revolutionary tribunal. "If this law passes," cried a deputy, "all we have to do is to blow our brains out". According to Fouquier-Tinville after Amar, Vadier proposed to change a few articles.  Fouquier, who feared to be incapable to deal with the number of trials sent him a letter, but Robespierre didn't reply. Not long after the committee decided to organize batches of 50 people. The Tribunal became more akin to a court of condemnation, refusing suspects the right of counsel and allowing only one of two verdicts – complete acquittal or death and that based not on evidence but on the moral conviction of the jurors. The courtroom was renovated to allow sixty people to be sentenced simultaneously. Within three days, 156 people were sent in batches to the guillotine; all the members of Parliament of Toulouse were executed. The guillotine was moved to the Faubourg Saint-Antoine in order to stand out less.  According to François Furet, the prisons were overpopulated; they housed over 8,000 "suspects" at the beginning of Thermidor year II. The amount of death sentences doubled. The commune had to solve serious problems in the cemeteries because of the smell. Mid-July two new mass graves were dug at Picpus Cemetery in the impermeable ground.

Abolition of slavery 

Robespierre’s record on the issue of abolition, as well as that of other Montagnards, was ambiguous. The attitude of Robespierre on abolition has no shortage of contradictions and has raised doubts about his intentions supposed to slavery. It does not appear that he ever was a member of the Society of the Friends of the Blacks. 

On 7 May 1791, the National Constituent Assembly again addressed the question of the colonies. On 13 May 1791 he was opposed to the word "slaves" being included in a law; he denounced slave trade. He recalled that slavery was in contradiction with the Declaration of the Rights of Man and of the Citizen. On 15 May 1791 the Constituent Assembly granted citizenship to "all people of colour born of free parents", although it left slavery untouched. Robespierre argued passionately in the Assembly against the Colonial Committee, dominated by plantation and slaveholders in the Caribbean. The colonial lobby declared that political rights for black people would cause France to lose her colonies. Robespierre responded, "We should not compromise the interests humanity holds most dear, the sacred rights of a significant number of our fellow citizens," later shouting, "Perish the colonies, if it will cost you your happiness, your glory, your freedom. Perish the colonies!" Robespierre was furious that the assembly gave "constitutional sanction to slavery in the colonies", and argued for equal political rights regardless of skin colour. The colonial whites refused to implement the decree. After this move the whites thought about separation from France. 

Robespierre did not argue for slavery's immediate abolition, but slavery advocates in France regarded Robespierre as a "bloodthirsty innovator" and a traitor plotting to give French colonies to England.  On 4 April 1792, Louis XVI affirmed the Jacobin decree, granting equal political rights to free blacks and mulattoes in Saint-Domingue. On 2 June 1792, the French National Assembly appointed a three man Civil Commission, led by Léger Félicité Sonthonax, to go to Saint-Domingue and insure the enforcement of the April 4th decree, but eventually issued a proclamation of general emancipation that included black slaves. Robespierre denounced the slave trade in a speech before the Convention in April 1793.

Babeuf called upon Chaumette to take the lead in convincing the Convention to accept the seven additional articles on the scale and scope of property rights which the Jacobin leader Maximilien Robespierre, in a speech to the Convention on 24 April 1793, had presented for incorporation into the new Declaration of Rights 
He attended a meeting of the Jacobin club on 3 June 1793 to support a decree ending slavery. On 4 June 1793, a delegation of sans-culottes and men of colour, led by Chaumette, presented to the convention a petition requesting the general freedom of the blacks in the colonies. On 6 July Marat was elected to the board of the colonial Convention. The abolition of slavery was written into the Declaration of the Rights of Man and Citizen of 1793.  The radical 1793 constitution supported by Robespierre and the Montagnards, which was ratified in August by a national referendum, granted universal suffrage to French men and explicitly condemned slavery. However, the French Constitution of 1793 was never implemented.

From August former slaves on St Domingue would enjoy 'all the rights of French citizens'. In August 1793, a growing group of slaves in St Domingue led a Haitian revolution against slavery and colonial rule. Robespierre defended the rights of free of color at the expense of the slaves. Sonthonax decreed the end of slavery in the north of Saint-Domingue (29 August 1793), as did Polverel shortly afterwards in the south and west. On 31 October 1793 slavery was completely abolished. On 17 November 1793, Robespierre insulted the people who denied the existence of the French republic, calling them imbeciles, the deputies from the Gironde pygmies. He criticized the former governor of Saint-Domingue Sonthonax and Étienne Polverel, who had freed slaves on Haïti, but then proposed to arm them. Robespierre denounced the French minister to the newly formed United States, Edmond-Charles Genêt, who had sided with Sonthonax, and informed the Committee not to count on the whites to manage the colony. To justify their decision Sonthorax and Polverel sent a committee to the Paris Convention made up of a white man called Dufay, a Freedman called Mills, and a black man by the name of Jean-Baptiste Belley, himself a former slave.

By 1794, French debates concerning slavery reached their apogee. The discussions focused on the question if the colonies had to impose the same laws as in France. In late January, a small delegation of mixed colour, representing the slaveholders, their opponents, as well as a former slave arrived in France. After being briefly imprisoned, the member opposing slavery was freed on the orders of the Committee of Public Safety. The National Convention then passed a decree abolishing slavery in all the colonies and examine the behavior of Sonthonax and Polverel. 

On the day after the emancipation decree, Robespierre delivered a speech in the Convention arguing that terror and virtue were necessary. He praised the French as the first to "summon all men to equality and liberty, and their full rights as citizens", using the word slavery twice but without specifically mentioning the French colonies. Despite petitions from the slaveholding delegation, the Convention decided to endorse the decree in full. However, the decree was only implemented and applied in St Domingue (1793), Guadeloupe (December 1794) and French Guiana.

The position of Robespierre on the decree of 16 pluviose year II (4 February 1794) relative to the emancipation of the slaves, has been controversial. Robespierre's discretion, in February 1794, concerning the decree of abolition of slavery, was interpreted by French historian Claude Mazauric as a desire to avoid controversies. On 11 April 1794 the decree was changed. Robespierre signed orders to ratify the decree. The decree led to a surge in popularity for the Republic among Black people in St-Domingue, most of whom had already freed themselves and were seeking military alliances to guarantee their freedom. In May 1794 Toussaint Louverture joined the French after the Spanish refused to take steps to end slavery, and in repelling the English. After the days of 9-10 Thermidor, a campaign was launched in anti-slavery circles against Robespierre, accusing him of having wanted to maintain slavery, abolished by the Convention on February 4, 1794 as an extension of the abolition decided in August 1793 in Saint-Domingue by Sonthonax.

Cult of the Supreme Being 

Robespierre's desire for revolutionary change was not limited only to the political realm. He also opposed the Catholic Church and the pope, particularly their policy of clerical celibacy. Having denounced the Cult of Reason and other perceived excesses of dechristianization undertaken by political opponents in France, he sought to instill a spiritual resurgence across the nation predicated on Deist beliefs. On 6 May 1794 Robespierre announced to the Convention that in the name of the French people, the Committee of Public Safety had decided to recognize the existence of God and the immortality of the human soul. Accordingly, on 7 May, Robespierre delivered a long presentation to the Convention ‘on the relation of religious and moral ideas to republican principles, and on national festivals’. He dedicated festivals to the Supreme Being, to Truth, Justice, Modesty, Friendship, Frugality, Fidelity, Immortality, Misfortune, etc., in a word, to all the moral and republican virtues.  The Cult of the Supreme Being was based on the creed of the Savoy chaplain that Jean-Jacques Rousseau had outlined in Book IV of Emile.

In the afternoon of 8 June (also the Christian holiday of Pentecost) a "Festival of the Supreme Being" was held. Everything was arranged to the exact specifications that had been drawn up previously set before the ceremony. The ominous and symbolic guillotine had been moved to the original standing place of the Bastille. Pregnant women and breastfeeding mothers with their babies were specifically invited to walk in the procession which started at the Tuileries. (Joachim Vilate had invited Robespierre to have lunch in the Pavillon de Flore, but he ate little.)

The festival was also Robespierre's first appearance in the public eye as a leader for the people, and also as president of the Convention, to which he had been elected only four days earlier. Witnesses state that throughout the "Festival of the Supreme Being", Robespierre beamed with joy. He was able to speak of the things about which he was truly passionate, including virtue, nature, deist beliefs and his disagreements with atheism. He dressed elaborately, wearing feathers on his hat and holding fruit and flowers in his hands, and walked first in the festival procession. According to Michelet: "Robespierre, as usual, walked quickly, with an agitated air. The Convention did not move nearly so fast. The leaders, perhaps maliciously and out of perfidious deference, remained well behind him, thereby isolating him." The procession ended on the Champ de Mars. The Convention climbed to the summit, where a liberty tree had been planted. Robespierre delivered two speeches in which he emphasized his concept of a Supreme Being: there would be no Christ, no Mohammed.

Is it not He whose immortal hand, engraving on the heart of man the code of justice and equality, has written there the death sentence of tyrants? Is it not He who, from the beginning of time, decreed for all the ages and for all peoples liberty, good faith, and justice? He did not create kings to devour the human race. He did not create priests to harness us, like vile animals, to the chariots of kings and to give to the world examples of baseness, pride, perfidy, avarice, debauchery and falsehood. He created the universe to proclaim His power. He created men to help each other, to love each other mutually, and to attain to happiness by the way of virtue.

Robespierre came down the mountain in a way that some claimed resembled Moses as the leader of the people. To offset his small stature (160 cm), he wore elevated shoes.  While for some it was exciting to see him at his finest, other deputies agreed that Robespierre had played too prominent a role.  Someone was heard saying, "Look at the blackguard; it's not enough for him to be master, he has to be God". On 15 June, the president of the Committee of General Security, Vadier, on behalf of the two committees presented a report on a new conspiracy by Catherine Théot, Christophe Antoine Gerle and three others. He insinuated that Robespierre fitted her prophecies. His speech caused much laughter in the convention.  Robespierre felt ridiculed and demanded on the 26th that the investigation of Théot be stopped and Fouquier-Tinville replaced.  The deist Cult of the Supreme Being that he had founded and zealously promoted generated suspicion in the eyes of both anticlericals and other political factions, who felt he was developing grandiose delusions about his place in French society.

Downfall 

On 20 May, Robespierre personally signed the warrant for the arrest of Tallien's lover, Theresa Cabarrus.  On 23 May,  Cécile Renault was arrested after having approached Robespierre's residence with two penknives and a change of underwear in her bag. She said the fresh linen was for her execution. She was executed together with three family members and 50 others on 17 June; Charles-Henri Sanson left the scaffold sick. Robespierre refused to reunite husbands, wives and children dispersed in different prisons in a common detention facility. He used this assassination attempt against him as a pretext for scapegoating the British. 

On 10 June, the Law of 22 Prairial was introduced without consultation from the Committee of General Security, which deepened the conflict between the two committees. It doubled the number of executions in Paris; the so-called "Great Terror" had begun.  Collot d'Herbois, Fouché and Tallien feared for their lives, due to these excesses they had committed in various regions of France to stamp out opposition to the revolutionary government. Like Brissot, Madame Roland, Pétion, Hébert and Danton, Tallien was accused of organizing (or taking part in) conspicuous dinners. Almost all the deputies agreed it had become dangerous. 

On 11 June Robespierre attacked Fouché, accusing him of leading a conspiracy. On 12/13 June, finding himself in a minority, he withdrew, choked with rage and disappointment, swearing never to set foot again in the committee, so long as the conflict continued.   On 21 June Robespierre attacked the journalists of the Moniteur Universel: "I prohibit you from inserting my discourses in your papers till you have previously communicated them to me." On 24 June Carnot presciently dispatched a large part of the Parisian artillery to the front. Meanwhile, the Austrian Netherlands were almost entirely occupied by the French. At the end of June, Robespierre hastily recalled Saint-Just, who came to realise that Robespierre's political position had degraded significantly.  For the second time, Carnot described Saint-Just and Robespierre as "ridiculous dictators". Calling for more purges, Robespierre would lose the favour of his committees. Carnot and Cambon proposed to end the terror.

July 1794
On 1 July, Robespierre spoke in the Jacobin club: "In London, I am denounced to the French army as a dictator; the same slanders have been repeated in Paris." On 3 July he left a meeting of the Committee slamming the door and shouting "Then save the country without me". The next day he admitted: "As for me I have one foot in the tomb; in a few days the other will follow it." He attacked Tallien and had him excluded from the Jacobins on 11 July. On 14 July Robespierre had Fouché expelled. To evade arrest, which usually took place during the night, about fifty deputies avoided staying at home.  (In early July, a group of 60 people, aged between 17 and 80 was arrested as "enemies of the people" and accused of conspiring against liberty.)

To escape the heat, he occasionally went to Maisons-Alfort, 12 km outside of Paris, and stayed on a farm owned by François-Pierre Deschamps, his courier. Robespierre walked through the fields or along the Marne. According to Vilate, Robespierre went for a 2-hour walk each day with his Danish dog, called Brount.  On  23 July,  the two committees met in a plenary session. Robespierre was there, suspicious; he undoubtedly underestimated the strength of his opponents, according to Leuwers.

Saint-Just declared in negotiations with Barère that he was prepared to make concessions on the subordinate position of the Committee of General Security. Couthon proposed his resignation "rather than be suspected of taking part in measures" against his colleagues. He agreed to more cooperation between the two committees. For Robespierre, the Committee of General Security had to remain subordinate to the Committee of Public Safety. He wanted to take away the authority of the Committee of General Security, as the committees were acting as two governments.
The next day Robespierre was compared to Catiline; he himself preferred the virtues of Cato the Younger.

Robespierre was obliged to commence the attack in the convention itself. He decided to make himself clear in a new report. On Saturday 26 July, Robespierre reappeared at the convention and delivered a two-hour-long speech on the villainous factions. Dressed in the same sky-blue coat and nankeen trousers which he had worn on the proclamation of the Supreme Being, he defended himself against charges of dictatorship and tyranny and then proceeded to warn of a conspiracy against the Committee of Public Safety. Calumny, he charged, had forced him to retire for a time from the Committee of Public Safety; he found himself the most unhappy of men. He gave the impression that no one was his friend, that no one could be trusted. He complained of being blamed for everything; and that not only England but also members of the Committee of General Security were involved in intrigue to bring him down. (When he was interrupted, Robespierre accused Collot of limiting the freedom of speech.) Specifically, he railed against the bloody excesses he had observed during the Terror. "I'm made to fight crime, not to govern it", he declared. He addressed the moderate party, by reminding them that they were indebted to him for the lives of the 73 Girondins.  Robespierre recommended a new wave of purification. "Punish the traitors, purge the bureau of the Committee of General Security, purge the Committee itself, and subordinate it to the Committee of Public Safety, purge the Committee of Public Safety itself and create a unified government under the supreme authority of the Convention". Collot questioned Robespierre’s motives, accusing him of seeking to become a dictator. Fréron suggested to revoke the decree which gave the committee power to arrest the representatives of the people, but his motion to dissolve the two committees was rejected. 

When called upon to name those whom he accused, he simply refused, except referring to Joseph Cambon, who flew to the rostrum. "One man paralyzes the will of the National Convention". His vehemence changed the course of the debate. At length Lecointre of Versailles arose and proposed that the speech should be printed. This motion was the signal for agitation, discussion, and resistance. The Convention decided not to have the text printed, as Robespierre's speech had first to be submitted to the two committees. It contained matters sufficiently weighty that it needed to first be examined. Robespierre was surprised that his speech would be sent to the very deputies he had intended to sue.  According to Couthon, not his speech, but the conspiracy had to be examined. Saint-Just promised to prepare a report how to break the deadlock.

In the evening, Robespierre delivered the same speech, which he regarded as his last will, at the Jacobin Club, where it was very well received. "Who am I, whom they accuse? A slave of Liberty, a living martyr of the Republic, the victim as well as the enemy of crime." He spoke of drinking hemlock, and David, the painter, cried out: "I will drink it with you." Collot d'Herbois and Billaud-Varenne were driven out because of their opposition to the printing and distribution of the text. Billaud managed to escape before he was assaulted, but Collot d'Herbois was knocked down. They set off to the Committee of Public Safety, where they found Saint-Just working. They asked him if he was drawing up their bill of indictment. Saint-Just promised to show them his speech before the session began. 

Gathering in secret, nine members of the two committees decided that it was all or nothing; to protect themselves, Robespierre had to be arrested. Barras said they would all die if Robespierre did not die. According to Barère, who as Robespierre never went on mission: "We never deceived ourselves that Saint-Just, cut out as a more dictatorial boss, would have ended up overthrowing him to put himself in his place; we also knew that we stood in the way of his projects and that he would have us guillotined; we had him stopped."  (The Convention lost 144 delegates in 13 months; 67 were executed, committed suicide, or died in prison.  The Convention often insisted on deputies' executions as the final steps in a process of political revival through purging.) Now extremists and indulgents joined against him. Laurent Lecointre was the instigator of the coup,  assisted by Barère, Fréron, Barras, Tallien, Thuriot, Courtois, Rovère, Garnier de l'Aube and Guffroy. Each one of them prepared his part in the attack. They decided that Hanriot, his aides-de-camp, Lavalette and Boulanger, the public prosecutor Dumas, the family Duplay and the printer Charles-Léopold Nicolas had to be arrested first, so Robespierre would be without support. (Fouché was seen as the leader of the conspiracy but hid in a garret at the rue Saint-Honoré; nothing is known about his part.)

9 Thermidor

Around noon on Sunday 27 July, the weather was stormy. The workers of Paris organized a demonstration against the Maximum on wages. Saint-Just went straight to the convention, prepared to place blame on Billaud, Collot d'Herbois and Carnot.  He began: "I am from no faction; I will contend against them all."  After a few minutes, Tallien — having a double reason for desiring Robespierre's end, as, on the evening before, Robespierre refused to release Theresa Cabarrus — interrupted him and began the attack. "Yesterday a member of the government was left quite isolated and made a speech in his own name; today another one has done the same thing. Need I recall to you that expression addressed to the journalists in one of the last sittings of the Jacobins?   Lebas attempted to speak in defence of the triumvirs; he was not allowed to do so, and Billaud continued. "Yesterday, the president of the revolutionary tribunal [Dumas] openly proposed to the Jacobins that they should drive all impure men from the Convention." Billaud-Varennes complained about how he was treated in the Jacobin club on the evening before and that Saint-Just had not kept his promise to show them his speech before the meeting. One day, Billaud demanded the arrest of a secretary of the Committee had stolen 114.000 livres; Robespierre, who incessantly speaks of justice and virtue, was the only one prevented him from being arrested. Tallien demanded the arrest of Dumas, Hanriot and Boulanger. According to Barère, the committees asked themselves why there still existed a military regime in Paris; why all these permanent commanders, with staffs, and immense armed forces? The committees have thought it best to restore to the National Guard its democratic organization.

Almost thirty-five deputies spoke against Robespierre that day, most of them from the Mountain. As the accusations began to pile up, Saint-Just remained silent. Robespierre rushed toward the rostrum, appealed to the Plain to defend him against the Montagnards, but his voice was shouted down. Robespierre rushed to the benches of the Left but someone cried: "Get away from here; Condorcet used to sit here". He soon found himself at a loss for words after Vadier gave a mocking impression of him referring to the discovery of a letter under the mattress of the illiterate Catherine Théot. Robespierre foamed at the mouth, and his utterance was choked. When Garnier witnessed his inability to respond, he shouted, "The blood of Danton chokes him!" Robespierre then finally regained his voice to reply with his one recorded statement of the morning, a demand to know why he was now being blamed for the other man's death: "Is it Danton you regret? ... Cowards! Why didn't you defend him?"

At some time Louis Louchet called for Robespierre's arrest; Robespierre the Younger demanded to share his fate. The whole Convention agreed, including the two other members of the triumvirate, Couthon, and Saint-Just. Le Bas decided to join Saint-Just. Robespierre shouted that the revolution was lost when he descended the tribune. The five deputies were taken to the Committee of General Security and questioned.   Not long after, Hanriot was ordered to appear in the convention; he or someone else suggested to show up only accompanied by a crowd.  (Dumas was already arrested at noon  and at four o'clock taken to Sainte-Pélagie Prison, as well as members of the family Duplay.)  (The story about Marie Thérèse de Choiseul who would be one of the last guillotined in the afternoon, is not well known.) On horseback, Hanriot warned the sections that there would be an attempt to murder Robespierre, and mobilized 2,400 National Guards in front of the town hall. What had happened was not very clear to their officers;  either the convention was closed down or the Paris Commune. Nobody explained anything. Around six o'clock the city council summoned an immediate meeting to consider the dangers threatening the fatherland. It gave orders to close the gates and to ring the tocsin. For the convention, that was an illegal action without the permission of the two committees. It was decreed that anyone leading an "armed force" against the convention would be regarded as an outlaw. The city council was in league with the Jacobins to bring off an insurrection, asking them to send over reinforcements from the galleries, 'even the women who are regulars there'.

Arrest
In the early evening, the five deputies were taken in a cab to different prisons; Robespierre to the Palais du Luxembourg, Couthon to "La Bourbe" and Saint-Just to the "Écossais". Augustin was taken from Prison Saint-Lazare to La Force Prison, like Le Bas who was refused at the Conciergerie.  Around 8 p.m., Hanriot appeared at the Place du Carrousel in front of the convention with 40 armed men on horses, but was taken prisoner.  After 9 p.m., the vice-president of the Tribunal Coffinhal went to the Committee of General Security with 3,000 men and their artillery. As Robespierre and his allies had been taken to a prison in the meantime, he succeeded only in freeing Hanriot and his adjutants.

How the five deputies escaped from prison was disputed. According to Le Moniteur Universel, the jailers refused to follow the order of arrest, taken by the convention. According to Courtois and Fouquier-Tinville, the police administration was responsible for any in custody or release. Nothing could be done without an order of the mayor.  Escorted by two municipals, Robespierre the younger was the first to arrive at the town hall. An administrator of the police took Robespierre the older around 8 p.m. to the police administration on Île de la Cité as Robespierre refused to go to the town hall and insisted on being received in a prison. He hesitated for legal reasons for possibly two hours.

At around 10 p.m., the mayor sent a second delegation to go and convince Robespierre to join the Commune movement. Robespierre was taken to the town hall.  At around 11 p.m., Saint-Just was delivered, after which LeBas and Dumas were brought in. (Couthon arrived as the last one in the town hall, but after midnight.) The Convention declared the five deputies (plus the supporting members)  to be outlaws.  It then appointed Barras and ordered troops (4,000 men) to be called out.

After a whole evening spent waiting in vain for action by the Commune, losing time in fruitless deliberation, without supplies or instructions, the armed sections began to disperse.  According to Colin Jones, apathy prevailed, with most of them drifting back to their homes. A widely repeated account claims that heavy rain dispersed Robespierre's supporters but detailed metrological records from the nearby Paris Observatoire show that conditions were warm and dry that night. Around 400 men from three sections seem to have stayed on the Place de Grève, according to Courtois. At around 2 a.m., Barras and Bourdon, accompanied by several members of the convention,  arrived in two columns. Barras deliberately advanced slowly, in the hope of avoiding conflict by a display of force. Then Grenadiers burst into the Hôtel de Ville; 51 insurgents were gathering on the first floor. Robespierre and his allies had withdrawn to the smaller "secrétariat".

There are many stories about what happened next, but it seems in order to avoid capture, Augustin Robespierre took off his shoes and jumped from a broad cornice. He landed on some bayonets and a citizen, resulting in a pelvic fracture, several serious head contusions, and in an alarming state of "weakness and anxiety". LeBas killed himself with a pistol, handing another to Robespierre. According to Barras and Courtois, Robespierre wounded himself when he tried to commit suicide by pointing the pistol at his mouth, but the gendarme Méda prevented this. (This change in orientation might explain how Robespierre, sitting in a chair, got wounded from the upper right in the lower left jaw.) According to Bourdon, Méda then hit Couthon's adjutant in his leg. Couthon was found lying at the bottom of a staircase in a corner, having fallen from the back of his gendarme.  The unperturbed Saint-Just gave himself up without a word. According to Méda, Hanriot tried to escape by a concealed staircase to the third floor and his apartment.  Most sources say that Hanriot was thrown out of a window by Coffinhal after being accused of the disaster. (According to Ernest Hamel, it is one of the many legends spread by Barère.) Whatever the case, Hanriot landed in a small courtyard on a heap of glass. He had strength enough to crawl into a drain where he was found twelve hours later and taken to the Conciergerie. Coffinhal, who had successfully escaped, was arrested seven days later, totally exhausted.

Execution 

The wounded Robespierre spent the remainder of the night at the antechamber of the Committee of General Security. He lay on the table, his head on a deal (pine) box, his shirt covered in blood.  At 5 a.m. his brother and Couthon seem to have been taken to the nearest hospital, Hôtel-Dieu de Paris, to see a doctor. Barras did not allow Robespierre to be sent there too; the circumstances did not permit it. At ten in the morning according to Sanson a military doctor was invited and removed some of his teeth and fragments of his broken jaw. Robespierre was then placed in the cell in the Conciergerie in which Danton had slept while detained.

On 10 Thermidor (a décadi, a day of rest and festivity) around 12.30 the Revolutionary Tribunal gathered. Verifying their identity Fouquier-Tinville had to solve a problem as 13 of them were members of the insurrectionary Commune. Around 2 a.m. Robespierre and 21 "Robespierrists"  were accused of counter-revolution and condemned to death by the rules of the law of 22 Prairial. Around 6 p.m., the convicts, whose average age was 34, were taken in three carts to the Place de la Révolution to be executed along with  the cobbler Antoine Simon, the jailer of the Dauphin. A mob screaming curses followed them right up to the scaffold. His face still swollen, Robespierre kept his eyes closed throughout the procession. He was the tenth called to the platform and ascended the steps of the scaffold unassisted. When clearing Robespierre's neck, executioner Charles-Henri Sanson tore off the bandage that was holding his shattered jaw in place, causing him to produce an agonised scream until the fall of the blade silenced him. Sanson's grandson wrote that while his grandfather did this carefully, Robespierre nevertheless roared like a tiger in response. After he was beheaded, applause and joyous cries arose from the crowd and reportedly persisted for fifteen minutes. Robespierre and associates were later buried in a common grave at the newly opened Errancis Cemetery near what is now the Place Prosper-Goubaux. In the mid-19th century, their skeletal remains were transferred to the Catacombs of Paris.

Legacy and memory 

Robespierre is best known for his role as a member of the Committee of Public Safety as he signed 542 arrests, especially in the spring and summer of 1794. He exerted his influence to suppress the republican Girondins to the right, the radical Hébertists to the left and then the indulgent Dantonists in the centre. Though nominally all members of the committee were equally responsible, the Thermidorians held Robespierre as the most culpable for the bloodshed. The day after his death, Bertrand Barère, a prominent member of the Plain, an opportunist who cooperated in the tyranny, described him as "the Terror itself". On that day about half of the Paris Commune (70 members) were sent to the guillotine; meanwhile 35 sections congratulated the convention, some marched through the hall. On Thuriot's proposal, the Revolutionary Tribunal was suspended and replaced by a temporary commission. On 30 July Courtois took in custody Robespierre's books by Corneille, Voltaire, Rousseau, Mably, Locke, Bacon, Pope, articles by Addison and Steele in The Spectator, an English and Italian dictionary, an English grammar, and the Bible. Nothing about Richard Price or Joseph Priestley who had influenced Condorcet, Mirabeau, Clavière and Brissot so much. On 1 August, the Law of 22 Prairial was abolished. Fouquier-Tinville was arrested and not long after solicitors were reintroduced in the courtroom. On August 5, the Law of Suspects was disbanded; the Convention decided the release of all the prisoners, against whom weighs no charge. 

Between 6 and 20 August, Napoleon was put under house arrest in Nice because of his connections with Robespierre the younger. Mid August Courtois was appointed by the convention to collect evidence against Robespierre, Le Bas and Saint-Just, whose report has a poor reputation, selecting and destroying papers. At the end of the month, Tallien stated that all that the country had just been through was the "Terror" and that the "monster" Robespierre, the "king" of the Revolution, was the orchestrator. According to Charles Barbaroux, who visited him early August 1792, his pretty boudoir was full of images of himself in every form and art; a painting, a drawing, a bust, a relief and six physionotraces on the tables. The eyewitness Helen Maria Williams who worked as a translator in Paris, attributed all the grim events to his hypocrisy and cunning. She described him as the great conspirator against the liberty of France; she mentioned the forced enthusiasm required from the participants of the Festival of the Supreme Being. For Lazare Carnot: "this monster was above all a hypocrite; it is because he knew how to seduce the people". For Samuel Coleridge, one of the authors of The Fall of Robespierre he was worse than Oliver Cromwell.

In fact, a whole new political mythology was being created.   To preach the ideals of '93 after Thermidor was to expose oneself to suspicions of Robespierrism, suspicions which had to be avoided above all others. Two contrasting legends around Robespierre developed: a critical one that held Robespierre as an irresponsible, self-serving figure whose ambitions generated widespread calamity, and a supportive one that held him as an early friend of the proletariat, about to embark on economic revolution when he fell.

Robespierre's reputation has experienced several cycles of re-appraisal. His name peaked in the press in the middle of the 19th century, between 1880–1910 and in 1940. The laborious Buchez, a democratic mystic, was producing volumes (forty in all) in which the Incorruptible rose up as the Messiah and sacrificial being of the Revolution. For Jules Michelet, he was the "priest Robespierre" and for Alphonse Aulard Maximilien was a "bigot monomaniac" and "mystic assassin". For Mary Duclaux he was the "apostle of Unity" and Saint-Just a prophet.

His reputation peaked in the 1920s, during the Third French Republic when the influential French historian Albert Mathiez rejected the common view of Robespierre as demagogic, dictatorial, and fanatical. Mathiez argued he was an eloquent spokesman for the poor and oppressed, an enemy of royalist intrigues, a vigilant adversary of dishonest and corrupt politicians, a guardian of the First French Republic, an intrepid leader of the French Revolutionary government, and a prophet of a socially responsible state. François Crouzet collected many interesting details from French historians dealing with Robespierre. According to Marcel Gauchet Robespierre confused his private opinion and virtue.

By making himself the embodiment of virtue and of total commitment, Robespierre took control of the Revolution in its most radical and bloody phase: the Jacobin republic. His goal in the Terror was to use the guillotine to create what he called a "republic of virtue", wherein virtue would be combined with terror.

Robespierre's main ideal was to ensure the virtue and sovereignty of the people. He disapproved of any acts which could be seen as exposing the nation to counter-revolutionaries and traitors and became increasingly fearful of the defeat of the Revolution. He instigated the Terror and the deaths of his peers as a measure of ensuring the Republic of Virtue but his ideals went beyond the needs and want of the people of France. He became a threat to what he had wanted to ensure and the result was his downfall.

Lenin referred to Robespierre as a "Bolshevik avant la lettre" (before the term was coined) and erected the Robespierre Monument to him in 1918. The Voskresenskaya Embankment in St. Petersburg was renamed Naberezhnaya Robespera in 1923 but returned to its original name in 2014.

In 1941 Marc Bloch, a French historian, sighed disillusioned (a year before he decided to join the French Resistance): "Robespierrists, anti-robespierrists ... for pity's sake, just tell us who was Robespierre?" According to R.R. Palmer: the easiest way to justify Robespierre is to represent the other Revolutionists in an unfavourable or disgraceful light. This was the method used by Robespierre himself. Soboul argues that Robespierre and Saint-Just "were too preoccupied in defeating the interest of the bourgeoisie to give their total support to the sans-culottes, and yet too attentive to the needs of the sans-culottes to get support from the middle class". For Peter McPhee, Robespierre's achievements were monumental, but so was the tragedy of his final weeks of indecision. The members of the committee, together with members of the Committee of General Security, were as much responsible for the running of the Terror as Robespierre." They may have exaggerated his role to downplay their own contribution and used him as a scapegoat after his death. J-C. Martin and McPhee interpret the repression of the revolutionary government as a response to anarchy and popular violence, and not as the assertion of a precise ideology. Martin keeps Tallien responsible for Robespierre's bad reputation, and that the "Thermidorians" invented the "Terror" as there is no law that proves its introduction.

Many historians neglected Robespierre's attitude towards the French National Guard from July 1789, and as "public accuser", responsible for the officers within the police till April 1792. He then began promoting civilian armament and the creation of a revolutionary army of 23,000 men in his periodical. He defended the right of revolution and promoted a revolutionary armed force. Dubois-Crancé described Robespierre as the general of the Sansculottes. Lazare Carnot who took charge of the military situation became the enemy of Saint-Just in the Committee of Public Safety and reversed several measures. Also, Barère changed his mind; the voluntary Guards and militant Sans-culottes lost influence quickly in Spring 1794. The revisionist historian Furet thought that Terror was inherent in the ideology of the French Revolution and was not just a violent episode. Equally important is his conclusion that revolutionary violence is connected with extreme voluntarism.
Furet was especially critical of the "Marxist line" of Albert Soboul. George Rudé estimates that Robespierre made some 900 speeches, in which he often expressed his political and philosophical views forcefully.The number could be exaggerated. According McPhee: More than 630 times across five years he had lectured the assemblies or Jacobin Club about the virtues, but in the first seven months of 1794 he made only sixteen speeches in the National Convention, compared with 101 in 1793.  

McPhee stated on several previous occasions Robespierre had admitted that he was worn out; his personal and tactical judgment, once so acute, seems to have deserted him. The assassination attempts made him suspicious to the point of obsession. There is a long line of historians "who blame Robespierre for all the less attractive episodes of the Revolution." Jonathan Israel is sharply critical of Robespierre for repudiating the true values of the radical Enlightenment. He argues, "Jacobin ideology and culture under Robespierre was an obsessive Rousseauiste moral Puritanism steeped in authoritarianism, anti-intellectualism, and xenophobia, and it repudiated free expression, basic human rights, and democracy." He refers to the Girondin deputies Thomas Paine, Condorcet, Daunou, Cloots, Destutt and Abbé Gregoire denouncing Robespierre's ruthlessness, hypocrisy, dishonesty, lust for power and intellectual mediocrity. According to Hillary Mantel: He could not survive if he trusted nobody, and could not work out who to trust.

Georges Lefebvre believed Robespierre to be a "staunch defender of democracy, a determined opponent of foreign war, saviour of the Republic and man of integrity and vision." However the Marxist approach that portrayed him as a hero has largely faded away. Zhu Xueqin became famous by and large due to his 1994 book titled The Demise of the Republic of Virtue: From Rousseau to Robespierre. This work has attracted countless readers since its publication and is still being read in the People's Republic of China today. For Aldous Huxley "Robespierre achieved the most superficial kind of revolution, the political." "Robespierre remains as controversial as ever, two centuries after his death."

Screen portrayals 
Over 300 commercial films in French and English have portrayed Robespierre's roles. Prominent examples include:
 Sidney Herbert portrayed Robespierre in Orphans of the Storm (1921)
 Werner Krauss portrayed Robespierre in Danton (1921)
 Edmond Van Daële portrayed Robespierre in Napoléon (1927)
 George Hackathorne portrayed Robespierre in Captain of the Guard (1930)
 Ernest Milton portrayed Robespierre in The Scarlet Pimpernel (1934)
 Henry Oscar portrayed Robespierre in The Return of the Scarlet Pimpernel (1937)
 Leonard Penn portrayed Robespierre in Marie Antoinette (1938)
 Richard Basehart portrayed Robespierre in Reign of Terror (1949)
 Keith Anderson portrayed Robespierre in the Doctor Who episode, The Reign of Terror (1964)
 Peter Gilmore as a character referred to only as "Citizen Robespierre" in Don't Lose Your Head, a Carry On spoof of The Scarlet Pimpernel (1967)
 Christopher Ellison portrayed Robespierre in Lady Oscar (1979)
 Richard Morant portrayed Robespierre in The Scarlet Pimpernel (1982)
 Wojciech Pszoniak portrayed Robespierre in Danton (1983)
 Andrzej Seweryn portrayed Robespierre in La Révolution française (1989)
 Ronan Vibert portrayed Robespierre in The Scarlet Pimpernel (1999–2000)
 Guillaume Aretos portrayed Robespierre in Mr. Peabody & Sherman (2014)
 Nicolas Vaude portrayed Robespierre in The Visitors: Bastille Day (2016)
 Louis Garrel portrayed Robespierre in One Nation, One King (2018)

Public memorials

Street names 
Robespierre is one of the few revolutionaries not to have a street named for him in the center of Paris. At the liberation, the municipal council (elected on 29 April 1945 with 27 communists, 12 socialists and 4 radicals out of 48 members), decided on 13 April 1946, to rename the Place du Marché-Saint-Honoré 'Place Robespierre', a decision approved at the prefectorial level on 8 June. However, in the wake of political changes in 1947, it reverted to its original name on 6 November 1950. Streets in the so-called 'Red belt' bear his name, e.g. at Montreuil. There is also a Metro station 'Robespierre' on Line 9 (Mairie de Montreuil – Pont de Sèvres), in the commune of Montreuil, named during the era of the Popular Front. There are, however, numerous streets, roads, and squares named for him elsewhere in France.

Plaques and monuments 
During the Soviet era, the Russians built two statues of him: one in Leningrad and another in Moscow (the Robespierre Monument). The monument was commissioned by Vladimir Lenin, who referred to Robespierre as a Bolshevik before his time. Due to the poor construction of the monument (it was made of tubes and common concrete), it crumbled within three days of its unveiling and was never replaced. The Robespierre Embankment in Saint-Petersburg across Kresty prison returned to its original name Voskresenskaya Embankment in 2014.

Arras 
 On 14 October 1923, a plaque was placed on the house at 9 Rue Maximilien Robespierre (formerly Rue des Rapporteurs) rented by the three Robespierre siblings in 1787–1789, in the presence of the mayor Gustave Lemelle, Albert Mathiez and Louis Jacob. Built in 1730, the house has had a varied history as a typing school, and a craftsmen's museum, but is now being developed as a Robespierre Museum.
 In 1994, a plaque was unveiled by ARBR on the façade of the Carrauts' brewery on the Rue Ronville, where Maximilien and Augustin were brought up by their grandparents.
 An Art Deco marble bust by Maurice Cladel was intended to be displayed in the gardens of the former Abbey of Saint-Vaast. A mixture of politics and concerns about weathering led to it being placed in the Hôtel de Ville. After many years in a tribunal room, it can now be seen in the Salle Robespierre. Bronze casts of the bust were made for the bicentenary and are displayed in his former home on Rue Maximilien Robespierre and at the Lycée Robespierre, unveiled in 1990.

Paris and elsewhere 
 Robespierre is commemorated by two plaques in Paris, one on the exterior of the Duplays' house, now 398 rue Saint-Honoré, the other, erected by the Société des études robespierristes in the Conciergerie.
 In 1909, a committee presided over by René Viviani and Georges Clemenceau proposed erecting a statue in the garden of the Tuileries, but press hostility and failure to garner enough public subscriptions led to its abandonment. However, Robespierre is recognisable in François-Léon Sicard's marble Altar of the National Convention (1913), originally intended for the gardens of the Tuileries and now in the Panthéon.
 A stone bust by Albert Séraphin (1949) stands in the square Robespierre, opposite the theatre in Saint-Denis, with the inscription: "Maximilien Robespierre l'Incorruptible 1758–1794".
 Charles Correia's 1980s bronze sculptural group at the Collège Robespierre in Épinay-sur-Seine depicts him and Louis Antoine de Saint-Just at a table, working on the 1793 Constitution and Declaration of Human Rights. A mural in the school also depicts him.
 In 1986, Claude-André Deseine's terracotta bust of 1791 was bought for the new Musée de la Révolution française at Vizille. This returned to public view Robespierre's only surviving contemporary sculpted portrait. A plaster cast of it is displayed at the Conciergerie in Paris, and a bronze cast is in the Place de la Révolution Française in Montpellier, with bronzes of other figures of the time.

Resistance units 
In the Second World War, several French Resistance groups took his name: the Robespierre Company in Pau, commanded by Lieutenant Aurin, alias Maréchal; the Robespierre Battalion in the Rhône, under Captain Laplace; and a maquis formed by Marcel Claeys in the Ain.

Notes

References

Sources (selection) 

 
 Aulard, François-Alphonse (1897). La société des Jacobins: Mars à novembre 1794. Recueil de documents pour l'histoire du club des Jacobins de Paris (in French). 6. Librairie Jouaust. OCLC 763671875
 Bienvenu, Richard T. (1968) The Ninth of Thermidor: The Fall of Robespierre. Oxford University Press, New York.
 Blanc, Louis Jean Joseph (1869). Histoire de la Révolution française. Libr. Internationale.
 
 Davidson, Ian (2016) The French Revolution: From Enlightenment to Tyranny. Profile Books Ltd
 
 Dunoyer, Alphonse (1913) The public prosecutor of the terror, Antoine Quentin Fouquier-Tinville. New York: G.P. Putnam's sons.
 
 
 Hamel, Ernest (1897) Thermidor: d'après les sources originales et les documents authentiques (in French) (2nd ed.). Flammarion. OCLC 764094902
 
 Hardman, John (1999) Robespierre. Profiles in power. Longman.  – via Google Books.
  A collection of essays covering not only Robespierre's thoughts and deeds, but also the way he has been portrayed by historians and fictional writers alike.
  by Hilary Mantel in the London Review of Books, Vol. 22, No. 7, p. 30 March 2000.
 Hazan, Eric (2014) A People's History of the French Revolution. Verso. London. New York. 
 
 
 
 
 
 Lewes, G.H. (1849) The life of Robespierre
 
 
 
 
 
 
 
 McPhee, Peter. "The Robespierre Problem: An Introduction," H-France Salon, Vol 7 no, 14, 2015, page 9. online
 Michelet, Jules (1847) The History of the French Revolution (Charles Cocks, trans.) online
 Mignet, François (1826) History of the French Revolution, from 1789 to 1814: Volume 1. Hunt and Clarke, Tavistock Street, Covent Garden.
 
 
 
  A political portrait of Robespierre, examining his changing image among historians and the different aspects of Robespierre as an 'ideologue', as a political democrat, as a social democrat, as a practitioner of revolution, as a politician and as a popular leader/leader of revolution.
 
 
  by Hilary Mantel in the London Review of Books, Vol. 28 No. 8, 20 April 2006.
 Reviewed by Sudhir Hazareesingh in The Times Literary Supplement, 7 June 2006.
 Sanson, Henri (1876). Memoirs of the Sansons: From Private Notes and Documents (1688–1847). London: Chatto and Windus. OCLC 317736774

Further reading 
According to David P. Jordan: "Any comprehensive bibliography would be virtually impossible. In 1936 Gérard Walter drew up a list of over 10,000 works on Robespierre, and much has been done since."

 The French Revolution of 1789: As Viewed in the Light of Republican Institutions, by John Stevens Cabot Abbott
 Andress, David. "Living the Revolutionary Melodrama: Robespierre's Sensibility and the Construction of Political Commitment in the French Revolution." Representations 114#1 2011, pp. 103–128. online
 Belissa, Marc, and Julien Louvrier. "Robespierre in French and English language publications since 2000."  no. 1, pp. 73–93. Armand Colin, 2013.
 Benigno, Francesco. "Never the Same Again: On Some Recent Interpretations of the French Revolution."  English Edition 71.2 (2016): 189–216 online.
 Richard Cobb, Paris-La Haye, Mouton and Co, 1961–1963, 2 volumes in-8°, VIII–1017, présentation en ligne, présentation en ligne.
 Cobban, Alfred. "The Political Ideas of Maximilien Robespierre during the Period of the Convention", English Historical Review Vol. 61, No. 239 (January 1946), pp. 45–80 
 Cobban, Alfred. "The Fundamental Ideas of Robespierre", English Historical Review Vol. 63, No. 246 (1948), pp. 29–51 
 Dicus, Andrew. "Terror and Self-Evidence: Robespierre and the General Will." European Romantic Review 31.2 (2020): 199–218.
  Presents Robespierre as the origin of Fascist dictators.
 Hodges, Donald Clark (2003) Deep Republicanism: Prelude to Professionalism. Lexington Books.
 Jones, Colin. "The overthrow of Maximilien Robespierre and the "indifference" of the people". American Historical Review 119.3 (2014): 689–713.
 Koekkoek, René (2020) The Citizenship Experiment Contesting the Limits of Civic Equality and Participation in the Age of Revolutions. Studies in the History of Political Thought
 Linton, Marisa. "Robespierre and the Terror", History Today, August 2006, Volume 56, Issue 8, pp. 23–29 
 Linton, Marisa. "The choices of Maximilien Robespierre." H-France Salon 7.14 (2015) online.
 Linton, Marisa, 'Robespierre et l'authenticité révolutionnaire', 371 (janvier-mars 2013): 153–73.
 
  A sympathetic study of the Committee of Public Safety.
 Parry, Albert. Terrorism: from Robespierre to the weather underground.  Courier, 2013).
 Poirot, Thibaut. "Robespierre and War, a question posed as early as 1789?."  no. 1, pp. 115–135. Armand Colin, 2013.
 Popkin, Jeremy D. A New World Begins: The History of the French Revolution (2018)
 
 Rudé, George. "Robespierre"History Today (Apr 1958) 8#4 pp 221–229.
 Scott, Otto. Robespierre: The Voice of Virtue (Routledge, 2017).
 Sepinwall, Alyssa Goldstein. "Robespierre, Old Regime Feminist? Gender, the Late Eighteenth Century, and the French Revolution Revisited." Journal of Modern History 82#1 2010, pp. 1–29. online
 Shusterman, Noah C. "All of His Power Lies in the Distaff: Robespierre, Women and the French Revolution." Past & Present 223.1 (2014): 129–160.
 Smyth, Jonathan. Robespierre and the Festival of the Supreme Being: The search for a republican morality (Manchester UP, 2016).
 Soboul, Albert. "Robespierre and the Popular Movement of 1793–4", Past and Present, No. 5. (May 1954), pp. 54–70. 
 Turner, Michael J. "Revolutionary Connection: 'The Incorruptible' Maximilian Robespierre and the 'Schoolmaster of Chartism' Bronterre O'Brien." The Historian 75.2 (2013): 237–261.

External links 

 
 La Révolution française (film) by Richard T. Heffron (1989 dramatisation reflecting the official narrative of the Bicentenary commemorations, based on the view point of François Furet, rejecting a Marxist interpretation): The French Revolution — Part 2 — English subtitles
In reaction a "more balanced" picture is presented by:
 Biography: essential elements of his life
 Conspiracy and Terror in the French Revolution – Marisa Linton (Kingston University) Public Lecture
 The Robespierre Problem – Peter McPhee (University of Melbourne) and Colin Jones (University of London) discussion
 An Introduction to the French Revolution and a Brief History of France (34 videos
 The Thermidorian Reaction (Part 1/2)
 25. The Armies of the Revolution and Dumoriez's Betrayal

 
1758 births
1794 deaths
18th-century French male writers
18th-century French lawyers
18th-century French writers
18th-century jurists
Anti-monarchists
Artesian people
Critics of atheism
Critics of the Catholic Church
Deputies to the French National Convention
Executed revolutionaries
French deists
French jurists
French people executed by guillotine during the French Revolution
French republicans
French revolutionaries
French shooting survivors
Jacobins
Leaders ousted by a coup
Lycée Louis-le-Grand alumni
Montagnards
People from Arras
People of the Reign of Terror
People on the Committee of Public Safety
Political philosophers
Presidents of the National Convention
Regicides of Louis XVI
French radicals
French social commentators
Social philosophers
Politicide perpetrators